

27001–27100 

|-bgcolor=#d6d6d6
| 27001 ||  || — || February 22, 1998 || Haleakala || NEAT || — || align=right | 13 km || 
|-id=002 bgcolor=#FFC2E0
| 27002 ||  || — || February 23, 1998 || Mauna Kea || D. J. Tholen, R. J. Whiteley || APO +1kmPHA || align=right data-sort-value="0.80" | 800 m || 
|-id=003 bgcolor=#d6d6d6
| 27003 Katoizumi ||  ||  || February 21, 1998 || Kuma Kogen || A. Nakamura || — || align=right | 5.2 km || 
|-id=004 bgcolor=#d6d6d6
| 27004 Violetaparra ||  ||  || February 27, 1998 || Caussols || ODAS || EOS || align=right | 6.7 km || 
|-id=005 bgcolor=#fefefe
| 27005 Dariaguidetti ||  ||  || February 27, 1998 || Cima Ekar || G. Forti, M. Tombelli || slow? || align=right | 6.2 km || 
|-id=006 bgcolor=#fefefe
| 27006 ||  || — || March 2, 1998 || Xinglong || SCAP || FLO || align=right | 2.2 km || 
|-id=007 bgcolor=#fefefe
| 27007 ||  || — || March 21, 1998 || Kitt Peak || Spacewatch || NYS || align=right | 2.1 km || 
|-id=008 bgcolor=#E9E9E9
| 27008 ||  || — || March 20, 1998 || USNO Flagstaff || C. B. Luginbuhl || — || align=right | 7.1 km || 
|-id=009 bgcolor=#E9E9E9
| 27009 ||  || — || March 25, 1998 || Caussols || ODAS || — || align=right | 3.7 km || 
|-id=010 bgcolor=#d6d6d6
| 27010 ||  || — || March 26, 1998 || Haleakala || NEAT || EOS || align=right | 8.1 km || 
|-id=011 bgcolor=#fefefe
| 27011 ||  || — || March 20, 1998 || Socorro || LINEAR || — || align=right | 3.2 km || 
|-id=012 bgcolor=#fefefe
| 27012 ||  || — || March 20, 1998 || Socorro || LINEAR || — || align=right | 2.3 km || 
|-id=013 bgcolor=#E9E9E9
| 27013 ||  || — || March 20, 1998 || Socorro || LINEAR || — || align=right | 6.6 km || 
|-id=014 bgcolor=#E9E9E9
| 27014 ||  || — || March 31, 1998 || Socorro || LINEAR || — || align=right | 3.0 km || 
|-id=015 bgcolor=#E9E9E9
| 27015 ||  || — || April 19, 1998 || Socorro || LINEAR || — || align=right | 4.0 km || 
|-id=016 bgcolor=#fefefe
| 27016 ||  || — || April 21, 1998 || Socorro || LINEAR || V || align=right | 3.3 km || 
|-id=017 bgcolor=#fefefe
| 27017 || 1998 JX || — || May 1, 1998 || Haleakala || NEAT || FLO || align=right | 2.1 km || 
|-id=018 bgcolor=#fefefe
| 27018 ||  || — || May 23, 1998 || Socorro || LINEAR || V || align=right | 2.4 km || 
|-id=019 bgcolor=#d6d6d6
| 27019 ||  || — || June 24, 1998 || Socorro || LINEAR || EOS || align=right | 8.1 km || 
|-id=020 bgcolor=#fefefe
| 27020 ||  || — || July 26, 1998 || La Silla || E. W. Elst || — || align=right | 3.2 km || 
|-id=021 bgcolor=#fefefe
| 27021 ||  || — || July 26, 1998 || La Silla || E. W. Elst || — || align=right | 2.7 km || 
|-id=022 bgcolor=#fefefe
| 27022 ||  || — || August 17, 1998 || Socorro || LINEAR || FLO || align=right | 2.0 km || 
|-id=023 bgcolor=#fefefe
| 27023 Juuliamoreau ||  ||  || August 20, 1998 || Anderson Mesa || LONEOS || FLO || align=right | 4.3 km || 
|-id=024 bgcolor=#fefefe
| 27024 ||  || — || August 30, 1998 || Kitt Peak || Spacewatch || — || align=right | 2.4 km || 
|-id=025 bgcolor=#fefefe
| 27025 ||  || — || August 24, 1998 || Socorro || LINEAR || V || align=right | 2.0 km || 
|-id=026 bgcolor=#E9E9E9
| 27026 ||  || — || August 24, 1998 || Socorro || LINEAR || — || align=right | 10 km || 
|-id=027 bgcolor=#fefefe
| 27027 ||  || — || August 28, 1998 || Socorro || LINEAR || — || align=right | 7.4 km || 
|-id=028 bgcolor=#fefefe
| 27028 ||  || — || August 28, 1998 || Socorro || LINEAR || — || align=right | 3.7 km || 
|-id=029 bgcolor=#fefefe
| 27029 ||  || — || August 25, 1998 || La Silla || E. W. Elst || — || align=right | 2.4 km || 
|-id=030 bgcolor=#fefefe
| 27030 ||  || — || August 25, 1998 || La Silla || E. W. Elst || — || align=right | 2.5 km || 
|-id=031 bgcolor=#FFC2E0
| 27031 ||  || — || September 14, 1998 || Socorro || LINEAR || AMO +1km || align=right data-sort-value="0.94" | 940 m || 
|-id=032 bgcolor=#fefefe
| 27032 Veazey ||  ||  || September 15, 1998 || Anderson Mesa || LONEOS || — || align=right | 2.1 km || 
|-id=033 bgcolor=#fefefe
| 27033 ||  || — || September 14, 1998 || Socorro || LINEAR || — || align=right | 2.7 km || 
|-id=034 bgcolor=#fefefe
| 27034 ||  || — || September 14, 1998 || Socorro || LINEAR || — || align=right | 2.4 km || 
|-id=035 bgcolor=#fefefe
| 27035 ||  || — || September 14, 1998 || Socorro || LINEAR || — || align=right | 2.4 km || 
|-id=036 bgcolor=#fefefe
| 27036 ||  || — || September 14, 1998 || Socorro || LINEAR || — || align=right | 2.5 km || 
|-id=037 bgcolor=#fefefe
| 27037 ||  || — || September 14, 1998 || Socorro || LINEAR || FLO || align=right | 2.8 km || 
|-id=038 bgcolor=#fefefe
| 27038 ||  || — || September 14, 1998 || Socorro || LINEAR || FLO || align=right | 2.9 km || 
|-id=039 bgcolor=#fefefe
| 27039 ||  || — || September 14, 1998 || Socorro || LINEAR || FLO || align=right | 2.8 km || 
|-id=040 bgcolor=#fefefe
| 27040 ||  || — || September 14, 1998 || Socorro || LINEAR || — || align=right | 4.0 km || 
|-id=041 bgcolor=#fefefe
| 27041 ||  || — || September 14, 1998 || Socorro || LINEAR || — || align=right | 2.0 km || 
|-id=042 bgcolor=#fefefe
| 27042 ||  || — || September 14, 1998 || Socorro || LINEAR || — || align=right | 1.9 km || 
|-id=043 bgcolor=#fefefe
| 27043 ||  || — || September 14, 1998 || Socorro || LINEAR || — || align=right | 3.0 km || 
|-id=044 bgcolor=#fefefe
| 27044 ||  || — || September 14, 1998 || Socorro || LINEAR || FLO || align=right | 2.4 km || 
|-id=045 bgcolor=#fefefe
| 27045 ||  || — || September 14, 1998 || Socorro || LINEAR || — || align=right | 1.8 km || 
|-id=046 bgcolor=#fefefe
| 27046 ||  || — || September 14, 1998 || Socorro || LINEAR || — || align=right | 2.8 km || 
|-id=047 bgcolor=#fefefe
| 27047 Boisvert ||  ||  || September 14, 1998 || Socorro || LINEAR || — || align=right | 2.3 km || 
|-id=048 bgcolor=#fefefe
| 27048 Jangong ||  ||  || September 14, 1998 || Socorro || LINEAR || — || align=right | 3.2 km || 
|-id=049 bgcolor=#E9E9E9
| 27049 Kraus ||  ||  || September 18, 1998 || Goodricke-Pigott || R. A. Tucker || — || align=right | 10 km || 
|-id=050 bgcolor=#fefefe
| 27050 Beresheet ||  ||  || September 17, 1998 || Anderson Mesa || LONEOS || FLO || align=right | 2.6 km || 
|-id=051 bgcolor=#E9E9E9
| 27051 ||  || — || September 16, 1998 || Kitt Peak || Spacewatch || — || align=right | 2.9 km || 
|-id=052 bgcolor=#fefefe
| 27052 Katebush ||  ||  || September 21, 1998 || Caussols || ODAS || — || align=right | 4.0 km || 
|-id=053 bgcolor=#fefefe
| 27053 ||  || — || September 17, 1998 || Višnjan Observatory || Višnjan Obs. || — || align=right | 1.9 km || 
|-id=054 bgcolor=#fefefe
| 27054 Williamgoddard ||  ||  || September 18, 1998 || Anderson Mesa || LONEOS || — || align=right | 3.5 km || 
|-id=055 bgcolor=#E9E9E9
| 27055 ||  || — || September 24, 1998 || Catalina || CSS || HNS || align=right | 3.1 km || 
|-id=056 bgcolor=#d6d6d6
| 27056 Ginoloria ||  ||  || September 26, 1998 || Prescott || P. G. Comba || — || align=right | 6.6 km || 
|-id=057 bgcolor=#FA8072
| 27057 ||  || — || September 26, 1998 || Socorro || LINEAR || — || align=right | 2.7 km || 
|-id=058 bgcolor=#fefefe
| 27058 ||  || — || September 21, 1998 || Kitt Peak || Spacewatch || FLO || align=right | 3.1 km || 
|-id=059 bgcolor=#fefefe
| 27059 ||  || — || September 21, 1998 || Kitt Peak || Spacewatch || — || align=right | 1.9 km || 
|-id=060 bgcolor=#fefefe
| 27060 ||  || — || September 21, 1998 || Kitt Peak || Spacewatch || V || align=right | 3.5 km || 
|-id=061 bgcolor=#fefefe
| 27061 Wong ||  ||  || September 16, 1998 || Anderson Mesa || LONEOS || — || align=right | 2.2 km || 
|-id=062 bgcolor=#fefefe
| 27062 Brookeminer ||  ||  || September 17, 1998 || Anderson Mesa || LONEOS || MAS || align=right | 3.5 km || 
|-id=063 bgcolor=#fefefe
| 27063 Richardmontano ||  ||  || September 17, 1998 || Anderson Mesa || LONEOS || FLO || align=right | 1.9 km || 
|-id=064 bgcolor=#fefefe
| 27064 ||  || — || September 20, 1998 || La Silla || E. W. Elst || — || align=right | 5.8 km || 
|-id=065 bgcolor=#fefefe
| 27065 ||  || — || September 20, 1998 || La Silla || E. W. Elst || FLO || align=right | 4.3 km || 
|-id=066 bgcolor=#fefefe
| 27066 ||  || — || September 20, 1998 || La Silla || E. W. Elst || FLO || align=right | 3.9 km || 
|-id=067 bgcolor=#fefefe
| 27067 ||  || — || September 20, 1998 || La Silla || E. W. Elst || FLO || align=right | 2.6 km || 
|-id=068 bgcolor=#fefefe
| 27068 ||  || — || September 21, 1998 || La Silla || E. W. Elst || — || align=right | 6.1 km || 
|-id=069 bgcolor=#fefefe
| 27069 ||  || — || September 21, 1998 || La Silla || E. W. Elst || — || align=right | 3.6 km || 
|-id=070 bgcolor=#fefefe
| 27070 ||  || — || September 26, 1998 || Socorro || LINEAR || — || align=right | 3.0 km || 
|-id=071 bgcolor=#fefefe
| 27071 Rangwala ||  ||  || September 26, 1998 || Socorro || LINEAR || FLO || align=right | 2.5 km || 
|-id=072 bgcolor=#fefefe
| 27072 Aggarwal ||  ||  || September 26, 1998 || Socorro || LINEAR || — || align=right | 7.6 km || 
|-id=073 bgcolor=#E9E9E9
| 27073 ||  || — || September 26, 1998 || Socorro || LINEAR || — || align=right | 3.8 km || 
|-id=074 bgcolor=#fefefe
| 27074 Etatolia ||  ||  || September 26, 1998 || Socorro || LINEAR || — || align=right | 2.9 km || 
|-id=075 bgcolor=#fefefe
| 27075 ||  || — || September 18, 1998 || La Silla || E. W. Elst || — || align=right | 2.3 km || 
|-id=076 bgcolor=#fefefe
| 27076 ||  || — || September 20, 1998 || La Silla || E. W. Elst || — || align=right | 3.2 km || 
|-id=077 bgcolor=#fefefe
| 27077 ||  || — || October 13, 1998 || Caussols || ODAS || FLO || align=right | 1.7 km || 
|-id=078 bgcolor=#fefefe
| 27078 ||  || — || October 15, 1998 || Višnjan Observatory || K. Korlević || — || align=right | 3.0 km || 
|-id=079 bgcolor=#fefefe
| 27079 Vsetín ||  ||  || October 15, 1998 || Ondřejov || P. Pravec || — || align=right | 1.9 km || 
|-id=080 bgcolor=#fefefe
| 27080 ||  || — || October 14, 1998 || Višnjan Observatory || K. Korlević || — || align=right | 4.0 km || 
|-id=081 bgcolor=#fefefe
| 27081 ||  || — || October 15, 1998 || Višnjan Observatory || K. Korlević || V || align=right | 2.1 km || 
|-id=082 bgcolor=#fefefe
| 27082 Donaldson-Hanna ||  ||  || October 10, 1998 || Anderson Mesa || LONEOS || FLO || align=right | 3.5 km || 
|-id=083 bgcolor=#fefefe
| 27083 Alethialittle ||  ||  || October 11, 1998 || Anderson Mesa || LONEOS || — || align=right | 2.1 km || 
|-id=084 bgcolor=#fefefe
| 27084 Heidilarson ||  ||  || October 14, 1998 || Anderson Mesa || LONEOS || — || align=right | 1.6 km || 
|-id=085 bgcolor=#fefefe
| 27085 ||  || — || October 19, 1998 || Zeno || T. Stafford || — || align=right | 3.6 km || 
|-id=086 bgcolor=#fefefe
| 27086 Italicobrass ||  ||  || October 20, 1998 || Farra d'Isonzo || Farra d'Isonzo || — || align=right | 2.0 km || 
|-id=087 bgcolor=#fefefe
| 27087 Tillmannmohr ||  ||  || October 24, 1998 || Kleť || J. Tichá, M. Tichý || — || align=right | 3.6 km || 
|-id=088 bgcolor=#fefefe
| 27088 Valmez ||  ||  || October 22, 1998 || Ondřejov || P. Pravec || — || align=right | 2.6 km || 
|-id=089 bgcolor=#FA8072
| 27089 ||  || — || October 23, 1998 || Višnjan Observatory || K. Korlević || — || align=right | 2.1 km || 
|-id=090 bgcolor=#fefefe
| 27090 ||  || — || October 25, 1998 || Oizumi || T. Kobayashi || V || align=right | 3.2 km || 
|-id=091 bgcolor=#fefefe
| 27091 Alisonbick ||  ||  || October 28, 1998 || Socorro || LINEAR || — || align=right | 4.2 km || 
|-id=092 bgcolor=#fefefe
| 27092 ||  || — || October 30, 1998 || Višnjan Observatory || K. Korlević || — || align=right | 2.0 km || 
|-id=093 bgcolor=#fefefe
| 27093 ||  || — || October 30, 1998 || Višnjan Observatory || K. Korlević || FLO || align=right | 2.7 km || 
|-id=094 bgcolor=#fefefe
| 27094 Salgari ||  ||  || October 25, 1998 || Cima Ekar || U. Munari, F. Castellani || V || align=right | 3.2 km || 
|-id=095 bgcolor=#fefefe
| 27095 Girardiwanda ||  ||  || October 25, 1998 || Cima Ekar || U. Munari, F. Castellani || — || align=right | 2.5 km || 
|-id=096 bgcolor=#fefefe
| 27096 Jelenalane ||  ||  || October 18, 1998 || Anderson Mesa || LONEOS || — || align=right | 2.3 km || 
|-id=097 bgcolor=#fefefe
| 27097 ||  || — || October 18, 1998 || La Silla || E. W. Elst || FLO || align=right | 3.2 km || 
|-id=098 bgcolor=#fefefe
| 27098 Bocarsly ||  ||  || October 28, 1998 || Socorro || LINEAR || — || align=right | 3.9 km || 
|-id=099 bgcolor=#fefefe
| 27099 Xiaoyucao ||  ||  || October 28, 1998 || Socorro || LINEAR || — || align=right | 3.2 km || 
|-id=100 bgcolor=#fefefe
| 27100 ||  || — || November 12, 1998 || Oizumi || T. Kobayashi || — || align=right | 2.3 km || 
|}

27101–27200 

|-bgcolor=#fefefe
| 27101 Wenyucao ||  ||  || November 10, 1998 || Socorro || LINEAR || — || align=right | 2.5 km || 
|-id=102 bgcolor=#fefefe
| 27102 Emilychen ||  ||  || November 10, 1998 || Socorro || LINEAR || — || align=right | 3.5 km || 
|-id=103 bgcolor=#fefefe
| 27103 Sungwoncho ||  ||  || November 10, 1998 || Socorro || LINEAR || — || align=right | 1.7 km || 
|-id=104 bgcolor=#fefefe
| 27104 ||  || — || November 10, 1998 || Socorro || LINEAR || — || align=right | 2.5 km || 
|-id=105 bgcolor=#fefefe
| 27105 Clarkben ||  ||  || November 10, 1998 || Socorro || LINEAR || V || align=right | 2.2 km || 
|-id=106 bgcolor=#fefefe
| 27106 Jongoldman ||  ||  || November 10, 1998 || Socorro || LINEAR || V || align=right | 2.7 km || 
|-id=107 bgcolor=#fefefe
| 27107 Michelleabi ||  ||  || November 10, 1998 || Socorro || LINEAR || — || align=right | 3.8 km || 
|-id=108 bgcolor=#fefefe
| 27108 Bryanhe ||  ||  || November 10, 1998 || Socorro || LINEAR || — || align=right | 3.9 km || 
|-id=109 bgcolor=#d6d6d6
| 27109 ||  || — || November 15, 1998 || Catalina || CSS || — || align=right | 20 km || 
|-id=110 bgcolor=#fefefe
| 27110 Annemaryvonne ||  ||  || November 11, 1998 || Caussols || ODAS || — || align=right | 2.0 km || 
|-id=111 bgcolor=#fefefe
| 27111 ||  || — || November 12, 1998 || Kushiro || S. Ueda, H. Kaneda || — || align=right | 5.3 km || 
|-id=112 bgcolor=#E9E9E9
| 27112 ||  || — || November 12, 1998 || Kushiro || S. Ueda, H. Kaneda || — || align=right | 8.8 km || 
|-id=113 bgcolor=#fefefe
| 27113 ||  || — || November 14, 1998 || Socorro || LINEAR || FLO || align=right | 2.8 km || 
|-id=114 bgcolor=#d6d6d6
| 27114 Lukasiewicz ||  ||  || November 19, 1998 || Prescott || P. G. Comba || THM || align=right | 6.1 km || 
|-id=115 bgcolor=#E9E9E9
| 27115 ||  || — || November 19, 1998 || Oizumi || T. Kobayashi || — || align=right | 8.9 km || 
|-id=116 bgcolor=#E9E9E9
| 27116 ||  || — || November 19, 1998 || Oizumi || T. Kobayashi || GEF || align=right | 3.8 km || 
|-id=117 bgcolor=#E9E9E9
| 27117 ||  || — || November 19, 1998 || Oizumi || T. Kobayashi || EUN || align=right | 6.2 km || 
|-id=118 bgcolor=#E9E9E9
| 27118 ||  || — || November 25, 1998 || Oizumi || T. Kobayashi || PAD || align=right | 7.8 km || 
|-id=119 bgcolor=#E9E9E9
| 27119 ||  || — || November 25, 1998 || Oizumi || T. Kobayashi || — || align=right | 3.8 km || 
|-id=120 bgcolor=#fefefe
| 27120 Isabelhawkins ||  ||  || November 28, 1998 || Cocoa || I. P. Griffin || MAS || align=right | 2.7 km || 
|-id=121 bgcolor=#fefefe
| 27121 Joardar ||  ||  || November 21, 1998 || Socorro || LINEAR || — || align=right | 2.7 km || 
|-id=122 bgcolor=#fefefe
| 27122 ||  || — || November 21, 1998 || Socorro || LINEAR || — || align=right | 3.2 km || 
|-id=123 bgcolor=#fefefe
| 27123 Matthewlam ||  ||  || November 21, 1998 || Socorro || LINEAR || — || align=right | 2.4 km || 
|-id=124 bgcolor=#d6d6d6
| 27124 ||  || — || November 29, 1998 || Woomera || F. B. Zoltowski || EOS || align=right | 9.3 km || 
|-id=125 bgcolor=#fefefe
| 27125 Siyilee ||  ||  || November 18, 1998 || Socorro || LINEAR || NYS || align=right | 2.0 km || 
|-id=126 bgcolor=#fefefe
| 27126 Bonnielei ||  ||  || November 18, 1998 || Socorro || LINEAR || — || align=right | 4.9 km || 
|-id=127 bgcolor=#E9E9E9
| 27127 ||  || — || November 25, 1998 || Socorro || LINEAR || GEF || align=right | 4.3 km || 
|-id=128 bgcolor=#E9E9E9
| 27128 ||  || — || November 28, 1998 || Xinglong || SCAP || EUN || align=right | 6.3 km || 
|-id=129 bgcolor=#d6d6d6
| 27129 ||  || — || December 7, 1998 || Caussols || ODAS || — || align=right | 7.9 km || 
|-id=130 bgcolor=#E9E9E9
| 27130 Dipaola ||  ||  || December 8, 1998 || San Marcello || A. Boattini, M. Tombelli || — || align=right | 4.8 km || 
|-id=131 bgcolor=#fefefe
| 27131 ||  || — || December 9, 1998 || Oizumi || T. Kobayashi || EUT || align=right | 2.7 km || 
|-id=132 bgcolor=#fefefe
| 27132 Ježek ||  ||  || December 11, 1998 || Ondřejov || P. Pravec, L. Kotková || V || align=right | 2.1 km || 
|-id=133 bgcolor=#fefefe
| 27133 ||  || — || December 14, 1998 || Višnjan Observatory || K. Korlević || — || align=right | 2.6 km || 
|-id=134 bgcolor=#d6d6d6
| 27134 ||  || — || December 13, 1998 || Oizumi || T. Kobayashi || KOR || align=right | 5.2 km || 
|-id=135 bgcolor=#fefefe
| 27135 ||  || — || December 15, 1998 || Socorro || LINEAR || PHO || align=right | 5.3 km || 
|-id=136 bgcolor=#fefefe
| 27136 ||  || — || December 14, 1998 || Socorro || LINEAR || — || align=right | 6.8 km || 
|-id=137 bgcolor=#fefefe
| 27137 ||  || — || December 14, 1998 || Socorro || LINEAR || V || align=right | 3.5 km || 
|-id=138 bgcolor=#fefefe
| 27138 ||  || — || December 14, 1998 || Socorro || LINEAR || — || align=right | 3.5 km || 
|-id=139 bgcolor=#E9E9E9
| 27139 ||  || — || December 14, 1998 || Socorro || LINEAR || EUN || align=right | 7.9 km || 
|-id=140 bgcolor=#E9E9E9
| 27140 ||  || — || December 14, 1998 || Socorro || LINEAR || GEF || align=right | 5.7 km || 
|-id=141 bgcolor=#fefefe
| 27141 Krystleleung ||  ||  || December 14, 1998 || Socorro || LINEAR || V || align=right | 3.2 km || 
|-id=142 bgcolor=#E9E9E9
| 27142 ||  || — || December 13, 1998 || Kitt Peak || Spacewatch || — || align=right | 12 km || 
|-id=143 bgcolor=#fefefe
| 27143 ||  || — || December 14, 1998 || Socorro || LINEAR || — || align=right | 2.7 km || 
|-id=144 bgcolor=#d6d6d6
| 27144 ||  || — || December 14, 1998 || Socorro || LINEAR || — || align=right | 11 km || 
|-id=145 bgcolor=#E9E9E9
| 27145 ||  || — || December 15, 1998 || Socorro || LINEAR || — || align=right | 3.7 km || 
|-id=146 bgcolor=#E9E9E9
| 27146 ||  || — || December 16, 1998 || Socorro || LINEAR || EUN || align=right | 7.4 km || 
|-id=147 bgcolor=#d6d6d6
| 27147 Mercedessosa ||  ||  || December 17, 1998 || Caussols || ODAS || EOS || align=right | 5.1 km || 
|-id=148 bgcolor=#d6d6d6
| 27148 ||  || — || December 17, 1998 || Caussols || ODAS || EOS || align=right | 8.7 km || 
|-id=149 bgcolor=#E9E9E9
| 27149 ||  || — || December 17, 1998 || Oizumi || T. Kobayashi || — || align=right | 4.9 km || 
|-id=150 bgcolor=#E9E9E9
| 27150 Annasante ||  ||  || December 16, 1998 || Bologna || San Vittore Obs. || — || align=right | 9.1 km || 
|-id=151 bgcolor=#d6d6d6
| 27151 ||  || — || December 17, 1998 || Višnjan Observatory || K. Korlević || KOR || align=right | 7.3 km || 
|-id=152 bgcolor=#E9E9E9
| 27152 ||  || — || December 21, 1998 || Oizumi || T. Kobayashi || EUN || align=right | 4.1 km || 
|-id=153 bgcolor=#E9E9E9
| 27153 ||  || — || December 21, 1998 || Oizumi || T. Kobayashi || MAR || align=right | 7.6 km || 
|-id=154 bgcolor=#d6d6d6
| 27154 ||  || — || December 22, 1998 || Oizumi || T. Kobayashi || EOS || align=right | 7.5 km || 
|-id=155 bgcolor=#d6d6d6
| 27155 ||  || — || December 22, 1998 || Kitt Peak || Spacewatch || THM || align=right | 9.0 km || 
|-id=156 bgcolor=#fefefe
| 27156 ||  || — || December 21, 1998 || Xinglong || SCAP || — || align=right | 2.9 km || 
|-id=157 bgcolor=#d6d6d6
| 27157 ||  || — || December 25, 1998 || Višnjan Observatory || K. Korlević || HYG || align=right | 7.9 km || 
|-id=158 bgcolor=#d6d6d6
| 27158 Benedetti-Rossi ||  ||  || December 27, 1998 || Anderson Mesa || LONEOS || EOS || align=right | 8.3 km || 
|-id=159 bgcolor=#E9E9E9
| 27159 ||  || — || January 6, 1999 || Višnjan Observatory || K. Korlević || — || align=right | 3.6 km || 
|-id=160 bgcolor=#d6d6d6
| 27160 ||  || — || January 11, 1999 || Oizumi || T. Kobayashi || EOS || align=right | 7.7 km || 
|-id=161 bgcolor=#E9E9E9
| 27161 ||  || — || January 11, 1999 || Oizumi || T. Kobayashi || — || align=right | 7.2 km || 
|-id=162 bgcolor=#fefefe
| 27162 ||  || — || January 8, 1999 || Socorro || LINEAR || — || align=right | 4.8 km || 
|-id=163 bgcolor=#fefefe
| 27163 ||  || — || January 9, 1999 || Višnjan Observatory || K. Korlević || NYS || align=right | 2.8 km || 
|-id=164 bgcolor=#E9E9E9
| 27164 ||  || — || January 9, 1999 || Višnjan Observatory || K. Korlević || PAD || align=right | 4.0 km || 
|-id=165 bgcolor=#d6d6d6
| 27165 ||  || — || January 10, 1999 || Višnjan Observatory || K. Korlević || EOS || align=right | 6.9 km || 
|-id=166 bgcolor=#E9E9E9
| 27166 ||  || — || January 12, 1999 || Woomera || F. B. Zoltowski || — || align=right | 2.2 km || 
|-id=167 bgcolor=#d6d6d6
| 27167 ||  || — || January 14, 1999 || Višnjan Observatory || K. Korlević || — || align=right | 7.0 km || 
|-id=168 bgcolor=#E9E9E9
| 27168 ||  || — || January 14, 1999 || Višnjan Observatory || K. Korlević || WIT || align=right | 3.4 km || 
|-id=169 bgcolor=#d6d6d6
| 27169 Annelabruzzo ||  ||  || January 14, 1999 || Anderson Mesa || LONEOS || — || align=right | 8.2 km || 
|-id=170 bgcolor=#fefefe
| 27170 ||  || — || January 14, 1999 || Kitt Peak || Spacewatch || NYS || align=right | 2.2 km || 
|-id=171 bgcolor=#d6d6d6
| 27171 ||  || — || January 15, 1999 || Kitt Peak || Spacewatch || EOS || align=right | 6.9 km || 
|-id=172 bgcolor=#E9E9E9
| 27172 Brucekosaveach ||  ||  || January 15, 1999 || Anderson Mesa || LONEOS || — || align=right | 5.8 km || 
|-id=173 bgcolor=#fefefe
| 27173 ||  || — || January 18, 1999 || Kleť || Kleť Obs. || NYS || align=right | 2.2 km || 
|-id=174 bgcolor=#E9E9E9
| 27174 ||  || — || January 19, 1999 || Črni Vrh || Črni Vrh || — || align=right | 7.8 km || 
|-id=175 bgcolor=#d6d6d6
| 27175 ||  || — || January 18, 1999 || Oizumi || T. Kobayashi || — || align=right | 7.8 km || 
|-id=176 bgcolor=#fefefe
| 27176 ||  || — || January 19, 1999 || Višnjan Observatory || K. Korlević || — || align=right | 5.0 km || 
|-id=177 bgcolor=#d6d6d6
| 27177 ||  || — || January 19, 1999 || Višnjan Observatory || K. Korlević || THM || align=right | 12 km || 
|-id=178 bgcolor=#fefefe
| 27178 Quino ||  ||  || January 21, 1999 || Caussols || ODAS || — || align=right | 3.2 km || 
|-id=179 bgcolor=#E9E9E9
| 27179 ||  || — || January 23, 1999 || Višnjan Observatory || K. Korlević || — || align=right | 5.6 km || 
|-id=180 bgcolor=#d6d6d6
| 27180 ||  || — || February 7, 1999 || Oizumi || T. Kobayashi || KOR || align=right | 5.3 km || 
|-id=181 bgcolor=#E9E9E9
| 27181 ||  || — || February 7, 1999 || Oizumi || T. Kobayashi || — || align=right | 6.9 km || 
|-id=182 bgcolor=#d6d6d6
| 27182 ||  || — || February 8, 1999 || Kashihara || F. Uto || EOS || align=right | 10 km || 
|-id=183 bgcolor=#E9E9E9
| 27183 ||  || — || February 10, 1999 || Woomera || F. B. Zoltowski || — || align=right | 7.3 km || 
|-id=184 bgcolor=#d6d6d6
| 27184 Ciabattari ||  ||  || February 8, 1999 || Monte Agliale || S. Donati || KOR || align=right | 3.8 km || 
|-id=185 bgcolor=#E9E9E9
| 27185 ||  || — || February 10, 1999 || Socorro || LINEAR || — || align=right | 5.1 km || 
|-id=186 bgcolor=#d6d6d6
| 27186 ||  || — || February 10, 1999 || Socorro || LINEAR || KOR || align=right | 6.4 km || 
|-id=187 bgcolor=#d6d6d6
| 27187 ||  || — || February 10, 1999 || Socorro || LINEAR || — || align=right | 6.0 km || 
|-id=188 bgcolor=#E9E9E9
| 27188 ||  || — || February 10, 1999 || Socorro || LINEAR || — || align=right | 5.7 km || 
|-id=189 bgcolor=#d6d6d6
| 27189 ||  || — || February 10, 1999 || Socorro || LINEAR || 7:4 || align=right | 16 km || 
|-id=190 bgcolor=#d6d6d6
| 27190 ||  || — || February 10, 1999 || Socorro || LINEAR || EOS || align=right | 7.7 km || 
|-id=191 bgcolor=#d6d6d6
| 27191 ||  || — || February 10, 1999 || Socorro || LINEAR || TEL || align=right | 5.6 km || 
|-id=192 bgcolor=#fefefe
| 27192 Selenali ||  ||  || February 12, 1999 || Socorro || LINEAR || — || align=right | 4.4 km || 
|-id=193 bgcolor=#E9E9E9
| 27193 ||  || — || February 12, 1999 || Socorro || LINEAR || — || align=right | 4.0 km || 
|-id=194 bgcolor=#E9E9E9
| 27194 Jonathanli ||  ||  || February 12, 1999 || Socorro || LINEAR || — || align=right | 3.6 km || 
|-id=195 bgcolor=#d6d6d6
| 27195 ||  || — || February 12, 1999 || Socorro || LINEAR || HYG || align=right | 12 km || 
|-id=196 bgcolor=#d6d6d6
| 27196 ||  || — || February 12, 1999 || Socorro || LINEAR || — || align=right | 11 km || 
|-id=197 bgcolor=#d6d6d6
| 27197 Andrewliu ||  ||  || February 12, 1999 || Socorro || LINEAR || KOR || align=right | 4.2 km || 
|-id=198 bgcolor=#d6d6d6
| 27198 ||  || — || February 12, 1999 || Socorro || LINEAR || — || align=right | 8.8 km || 
|-id=199 bgcolor=#E9E9E9
| 27199 ||  || — || February 12, 1999 || Socorro || LINEAR || EUN || align=right | 5.1 km || 
|-id=200 bgcolor=#fefefe
| 27200 ||  || — || February 12, 1999 || Socorro || LINEAR || — || align=right | 3.2 km || 
|}

27201–27300 

|-bgcolor=#E9E9E9
| 27201 ||  || — || February 12, 1999 || Socorro || LINEAR || — || align=right | 5.8 km || 
|-id=202 bgcolor=#d6d6d6
| 27202 ||  || — || February 12, 1999 || Socorro || LINEAR || EOS || align=right | 7.7 km || 
|-id=203 bgcolor=#d6d6d6
| 27203 ||  || — || February 12, 1999 || Socorro || LINEAR || VER || align=right | 9.3 km || 
|-id=204 bgcolor=#d6d6d6
| 27204 ||  || — || February 12, 1999 || Socorro || LINEAR || — || align=right | 7.2 km || 
|-id=205 bgcolor=#d6d6d6
| 27205 ||  || — || February 12, 1999 || Socorro || LINEAR || — || align=right | 6.1 km || 
|-id=206 bgcolor=#d6d6d6
| 27206 ||  || — || February 12, 1999 || Socorro || LINEAR || — || align=right | 8.8 km || 
|-id=207 bgcolor=#E9E9E9
| 27207 ||  || — || February 10, 1999 || Socorro || LINEAR || — || align=right | 7.3 km || 
|-id=208 bgcolor=#d6d6d6
| 27208 Jennyliu ||  ||  || February 12, 1999 || Socorro || LINEAR || — || align=right | 7.6 km || 
|-id=209 bgcolor=#d6d6d6
| 27209 ||  || — || February 12, 1999 || Socorro || LINEAR || EOS || align=right | 5.6 km || 
|-id=210 bgcolor=#E9E9E9
| 27210 ||  || — || February 12, 1999 || Socorro || LINEAR || — || align=right | 4.3 km || 
|-id=211 bgcolor=#E9E9E9
| 27211 ||  || — || February 12, 1999 || Socorro || LINEAR || — || align=right | 5.2 km || 
|-id=212 bgcolor=#E9E9E9
| 27212 ||  || — || February 12, 1999 || Socorro || LINEAR || — || align=right | 4.2 km || 
|-id=213 bgcolor=#d6d6d6
| 27213 ||  || — || February 12, 1999 || Socorro || LINEAR || EOS || align=right | 5.8 km || 
|-id=214 bgcolor=#E9E9E9
| 27214 ||  || — || February 12, 1999 || Socorro || LINEAR || — || align=right | 5.6 km || 
|-id=215 bgcolor=#E9E9E9
| 27215 ||  || — || February 11, 1999 || Socorro || LINEAR || — || align=right | 4.4 km || 
|-id=216 bgcolor=#E9E9E9
| 27216 ||  || — || February 9, 1999 || Kitt Peak || Spacewatch || — || align=right | 3.7 km || 
|-id=217 bgcolor=#d6d6d6
| 27217 Mattieharrington ||  ||  || February 14, 1999 || Anderson Mesa || LONEOS || — || align=right | 6.7 km || 
|-id=218 bgcolor=#d6d6d6
| 27218 ||  || — || February 18, 1999 || Haleakala || NEAT || KOR || align=right | 5.5 km || 
|-id=219 bgcolor=#d6d6d6
| 27219 || 1999 EL || — || March 9, 1999 || Zeno || T. Stafford || TIR || align=right | 9.4 km || 
|-id=220 bgcolor=#d6d6d6
| 27220 ||  || — || March 19, 1999 || Socorro || LINEAR || — || align=right | 15 km || 
|-id=221 bgcolor=#E9E9E9
| 27221 ||  || — || March 19, 1999 || Socorro || LINEAR || — || align=right | 4.7 km || 
|-id=222 bgcolor=#d6d6d6
| 27222 ||  || — || March 19, 1999 || Socorro || LINEAR || — || align=right | 7.5 km || 
|-id=223 bgcolor=#d6d6d6
| 27223 ||  || — || April 7, 1999 || Nachi-Katsuura || Y. Shimizu, T. Urata || — || align=right | 16 km || 
|-id=224 bgcolor=#fefefe
| 27224 Telus ||  ||  || April 10, 1999 || Anderson Mesa || LONEOS || V || align=right | 2.0 km || 
|-id=225 bgcolor=#E9E9E9
| 27225 ||  || — || April 15, 1999 || Socorro || LINEAR || EUN || align=right | 7.3 km || 
|-id=226 bgcolor=#d6d6d6
| 27226 ||  || — || April 15, 1999 || Socorro || LINEAR || — || align=right | 23 km || 
|-id=227 bgcolor=#d6d6d6
| 27227 McAdam ||  ||  || April 7, 1999 || Anderson Mesa || LONEOS || THM || align=right | 10 km || 
|-id=228 bgcolor=#E9E9E9
| 27228 ||  || — || May 9, 1999 || Višnjan Observatory || K. Korlević || — || align=right | 6.9 km || 
|-id=229 bgcolor=#d6d6d6
| 27229 ||  || — || May 10, 1999 || Socorro || LINEAR || TIR || align=right | 9.2 km || 
|-id=230 bgcolor=#E9E9E9
| 27230 ||  || — || May 10, 1999 || Socorro || LINEAR || — || align=right | 3.7 km || 
|-id=231 bgcolor=#d6d6d6
| 27231 ||  || — || May 10, 1999 || Socorro || LINEAR || — || align=right | 8.0 km || 
|-id=232 bgcolor=#d6d6d6
| 27232 ||  || — || May 13, 1999 || Socorro || LINEAR || KOR || align=right | 4.5 km || 
|-id=233 bgcolor=#E9E9E9
| 27233 Mahajan ||  ||  || July 13, 1999 || Socorro || LINEAR || — || align=right | 4.5 km || 
|-id=234 bgcolor=#FA8072
| 27234 ||  || — || September 6, 1999 || Catalina || CSS || — || align=right | 1.8 km || 
|-id=235 bgcolor=#E9E9E9
| 27235 ||  || — || September 7, 1999 || Socorro || LINEAR || EUN || align=right | 3.2 km || 
|-id=236 bgcolor=#E9E9E9
| 27236 Millermatt ||  ||  || September 7, 1999 || Socorro || LINEAR || — || align=right | 2.7 km || 
|-id=237 bgcolor=#d6d6d6
| 27237 ||  || — || September 8, 1999 || Socorro || LINEAR || EOS || align=right | 6.4 km || 
|-id=238 bgcolor=#E9E9E9
| 27238 Keenanmonks ||  ||  || September 9, 1999 || Socorro || LINEAR || — || align=right | 4.1 km || 
|-id=239 bgcolor=#fefefe
| 27239 O'Dorney ||  ||  || September 8, 1999 || Socorro || LINEAR || FLO || align=right | 2.3 km || 
|-id=240 bgcolor=#fefefe
| 27240 Robhall ||  ||  || October 12, 1999 || Anderson Mesa || LONEOS || — || align=right | 4.1 km || 
|-id=241 bgcolor=#fefefe
| 27241 Sunilpai ||  ||  || October 2, 1999 || Socorro || LINEAR || V || align=right | 2.3 km || 
|-id=242 bgcolor=#fefefe
| 27242 ||  || — || October 1, 1999 || Catalina || CSS || — || align=right | 2.5 km || 
|-id=243 bgcolor=#fefefe
| 27243 ||  || — || October 28, 1999 || Catalina || CSS || V || align=right | 3.0 km || 
|-id=244 bgcolor=#fefefe
| 27244 Parthasarathy ||  ||  || November 3, 1999 || Socorro || LINEAR || NYS || align=right | 4.0 km || 
|-id=245 bgcolor=#fefefe
| 27245 ||  || — || November 14, 1999 || Socorro || LINEAR || NYS || align=right | 1.5 km || 
|-id=246 bgcolor=#fefefe
| 27246 ||  || — || November 2, 1999 || Catalina || CSS || FLO || align=right | 1.6 km || 
|-id=247 bgcolor=#fefefe
| 27247 ||  || — || November 5, 1999 || Catalina || CSS || — || align=right | 2.9 km || 
|-id=248 bgcolor=#fefefe
| 27248 Schristensen ||  ||  || November 12, 1999 || Anderson Mesa || LONEOS || — || align=right | 2.4 km || 
|-id=249 bgcolor=#fefefe
| 27249 ||  || — || November 28, 1999 || Gnosca || S. Sposetti || — || align=right | 3.3 km || 
|-id=250 bgcolor=#E9E9E9
| 27250 || 1999 XB || — || December 1, 1999 || Socorro || LINEAR || — || align=right | 3.7 km || 
|-id=251 bgcolor=#E9E9E9
| 27251 ||  || — || December 5, 1999 || Socorro || LINEAR || — || align=right | 6.5 km || 
|-id=252 bgcolor=#d6d6d6
| 27252 ||  || — || December 5, 1999 || Socorro || LINEAR || — || align=right | 6.0 km || 
|-id=253 bgcolor=#fefefe
| 27253 Graceleanor ||  ||  || December 6, 1999 || Socorro || LINEAR || NYS || align=right | 4.3 km || 
|-id=254 bgcolor=#fefefe
| 27254 Shubhrosaha ||  ||  || December 6, 1999 || Socorro || LINEAR || V || align=right | 1.5 km || 
|-id=255 bgcolor=#fefefe
| 27255 ||  || — || December 6, 1999 || Socorro || LINEAR || V || align=right | 3.1 km || 
|-id=256 bgcolor=#E9E9E9
| 27256 ||  || — || December 6, 1999 || Socorro || LINEAR || — || align=right | 4.0 km || 
|-id=257 bgcolor=#fefefe
| 27257 Tang-Quan ||  ||  || December 6, 1999 || Socorro || LINEAR || FLO || align=right | 3.0 km || 
|-id=258 bgcolor=#fefefe
| 27258 Chelseavoss ||  ||  || December 7, 1999 || Socorro || LINEAR || — || align=right | 2.6 km || 
|-id=259 bgcolor=#E9E9E9
| 27259 ||  || — || December 13, 1999 || Fountain Hills || C. W. Juels || GER || align=right | 8.3 km || 
|-id=260 bgcolor=#fefefe
| 27260 ||  || — || December 8, 1999 || Socorro || LINEAR || PHO || align=right | 4.9 km || 
|-id=261 bgcolor=#fefefe
| 27261 Yushiwang ||  ||  || December 8, 1999 || Socorro || LINEAR || — || align=right | 5.7 km || 
|-id=262 bgcolor=#fefefe
| 27262 ||  || — || December 12, 1999 || Socorro || LINEAR || V || align=right | 3.3 km || 
|-id=263 bgcolor=#fefefe
| 27263 Elainezhou ||  ||  || December 12, 1999 || Socorro || LINEAR || V || align=right | 2.3 km || 
|-id=264 bgcolor=#fefefe
| 27264 Frankclayton ||  ||  || December 12, 1999 || Socorro || LINEAR || — || align=right | 3.6 km || 
|-id=265 bgcolor=#fefefe
| 27265 Toddgonzales ||  ||  || December 4, 1999 || Anderson Mesa || LONEOS || V || align=right | 2.6 km || 
|-id=266 bgcolor=#fefefe
| 27266 || 1999 YH || — || December 16, 1999 || Socorro || LINEAR || H || align=right | 1.8 km || 
|-id=267 bgcolor=#fefefe
| 27267 Wiberg ||  ||  || December 28, 1999 || Fair Oaks Ranch || J. V. McClusky || — || align=right | 2.6 km || 
|-id=268 bgcolor=#fefefe
| 27268 ||  || — || December 31, 1999 || Oizumi || T. Kobayashi || FLO || align=right | 3.3 km || 
|-id=269 bgcolor=#fefefe
| 27269 Albinocarbognani ||  ||  || January 3, 2000 || San Marcello || M. Tombelli, A. Boattini || FLO || align=right | 3.3 km || 
|-id=270 bgcolor=#fefefe
| 27270 Guidotti ||  ||  || January 2, 2000 || San Marcello || L. Tesi, A. Caronia || — || align=right | 3.6 km || 
|-id=271 bgcolor=#d6d6d6
| 27271 ||  || — || January 3, 2000 || Socorro || LINEAR || — || align=right | 10 km || 
|-id=272 bgcolor=#fefefe
| 27272 ||  || — || January 3, 2000 || Socorro || LINEAR || — || align=right | 7.0 km || 
|-id=273 bgcolor=#fefefe
| 27273 ||  || — || January 3, 2000 || Socorro || LINEAR || — || align=right | 4.7 km || 
|-id=274 bgcolor=#fefefe
| 27274 ||  || — || January 3, 2000 || Socorro || LINEAR || FLO || align=right | 1.7 km || 
|-id=275 bgcolor=#d6d6d6
| 27275 ||  || — || January 4, 2000 || Socorro || LINEAR || EOS || align=right | 6.3 km || 
|-id=276 bgcolor=#fefefe
| 27276 Davidblack ||  ||  || January 4, 2000 || Socorro || LINEAR || — || align=right | 3.1 km || 
|-id=277 bgcolor=#fefefe
| 27277 Pattybrown ||  ||  || January 4, 2000 || Socorro || LINEAR || — || align=right | 2.1 km || 
|-id=278 bgcolor=#E9E9E9
| 27278 ||  || — || January 4, 2000 || Socorro || LINEAR || RAF || align=right | 5.5 km || 
|-id=279 bgcolor=#fefefe
| 27279 Boburan ||  ||  || January 4, 2000 || Socorro || LINEAR || NYS || align=right | 1.9 km || 
|-id=280 bgcolor=#fefefe
| 27280 Manettedavies ||  ||  || January 4, 2000 || Socorro || LINEAR || — || align=right | 3.4 km || 
|-id=281 bgcolor=#E9E9E9
| 27281 ||  || — || January 4, 2000 || Socorro || LINEAR || ADE || align=right | 4.2 km || 
|-id=282 bgcolor=#fefefe
| 27282 Deborahday ||  ||  || January 5, 2000 || Socorro || LINEAR || — || align=right | 2.2 km || 
|-id=283 bgcolor=#d6d6d6
| 27283 ||  || — || January 5, 2000 || Socorro || LINEAR || EOS || align=right | 6.3 km || 
|-id=284 bgcolor=#fefefe
| 27284 Billdunbar ||  ||  || January 4, 2000 || Socorro || LINEAR || NYS || align=right | 3.0 km || 
|-id=285 bgcolor=#E9E9E9
| 27285 ||  || — || January 4, 2000 || Socorro || LINEAR || EUN || align=right | 3.3 km || 
|-id=286 bgcolor=#fefefe
| 27286 Adedmondson ||  ||  || January 5, 2000 || Socorro || LINEAR || FLO || align=right | 2.6 km || 
|-id=287 bgcolor=#fefefe
| 27287 Garbarino ||  ||  || January 5, 2000 || Socorro || LINEAR || — || align=right | 1.9 km || 
|-id=288 bgcolor=#fefefe
| 27288 Paulgilmore ||  ||  || January 5, 2000 || Socorro || LINEAR || — || align=right | 2.9 km || 
|-id=289 bgcolor=#E9E9E9
| 27289 Myrahalpin ||  ||  || January 5, 2000 || Socorro || LINEAR || — || align=right | 2.9 km || 
|-id=290 bgcolor=#fefefe
| 27290 ||  || — || January 5, 2000 || Socorro || LINEAR || — || align=right | 4.9 km || 
|-id=291 bgcolor=#fefefe
| 27291 Greghansen ||  ||  || January 5, 2000 || Socorro || LINEAR || FLO || align=right | 2.0 km || 
|-id=292 bgcolor=#fefefe
| 27292 ||  || — || January 5, 2000 || Socorro || LINEAR || — || align=right | 7.1 km || 
|-id=293 bgcolor=#fefefe
| 27293 ||  || — || January 4, 2000 || Socorro || LINEAR || — || align=right | 5.8 km || 
|-id=294 bgcolor=#fefefe
| 27294 ||  || — || January 5, 2000 || Socorro || LINEAR || — || align=right | 6.3 km || 
|-id=295 bgcolor=#E9E9E9
| 27295 ||  || — || January 5, 2000 || Socorro || LINEAR || WAT || align=right | 6.5 km || 
|-id=296 bgcolor=#fefefe
| 27296 Kathyhurd ||  ||  || January 5, 2000 || Socorro || LINEAR || FLO || align=right | 4.3 km || 
|-id=297 bgcolor=#E9E9E9
| 27297 ||  || — || January 5, 2000 || Socorro || LINEAR || EUN || align=right | 4.3 km || 
|-id=298 bgcolor=#fefefe
| 27298 ||  || — || January 7, 2000 || Socorro || LINEAR || H || align=right | 1.7 km || 
|-id=299 bgcolor=#fefefe
| 27299 ||  || — || January 3, 2000 || Socorro || LINEAR || — || align=right | 2.8 km || 
|-id=300 bgcolor=#fefefe
| 27300 ||  || — || January 8, 2000 || Socorro || LINEAR || — || align=right | 4.8 km || 
|}

27301–27400 

|-bgcolor=#fefefe
| 27301 Joeingalls ||  ||  || January 6, 2000 || Socorro || LINEAR || FLO || align=right | 2.5 km || 
|-id=302 bgcolor=#fefefe
| 27302 Jeankobis ||  ||  || January 7, 2000 || Socorro || LINEAR || V || align=right | 2.2 km || 
|-id=303 bgcolor=#fefefe
| 27303 Leitner ||  ||  || January 7, 2000 || Socorro || LINEAR || FLO || align=right | 2.7 km || 
|-id=304 bgcolor=#fefefe
| 27304 ||  || — || January 8, 2000 || Socorro || LINEAR || — || align=right | 1.8 km || 
|-id=305 bgcolor=#d6d6d6
| 27305 ||  || — || January 10, 2000 || Socorro || LINEAR || — || align=right | 13 km || 
|-id=306 bgcolor=#E9E9E9
| 27306 ||  || — || January 10, 2000 || Socorro || LINEAR || — || align=right | 4.7 km || 
|-id=307 bgcolor=#fefefe
| 27307 ||  || — || January 8, 2000 || Kitt Peak || Spacewatch || EUT || align=right | 2.1 km || 
|-id=308 bgcolor=#E9E9E9
| 27308 ||  || — || January 3, 2000 || Socorro || LINEAR || — || align=right | 4.7 km || 
|-id=309 bgcolor=#fefefe
| 27309 Serenamccalla ||  ||  || January 4, 2000 || Socorro || LINEAR || — || align=right | 1.8 km || 
|-id=310 bgcolor=#E9E9E9
| 27310 ||  || — || January 5, 2000 || Socorro || LINEAR || EUN || align=right | 5.0 km || 
|-id=311 bgcolor=#E9E9E9
| 27311 Shannongonzales ||  ||  || January 5, 2000 || Anderson Mesa || LONEOS || — || align=right | 6.3 km || 
|-id=312 bgcolor=#E9E9E9
| 27312 Sconantgilbert ||  ||  || January 6, 2000 || Anderson Mesa || LONEOS || — || align=right | 7.0 km || 
|-id=313 bgcolor=#E9E9E9
| 27313 ||  || — || January 7, 2000 || Socorro || LINEAR || — || align=right | 3.7 km || 
|-id=314 bgcolor=#fefefe
| 27314 Janemcdonald ||  ||  || January 2, 2000 || Socorro || LINEAR || — || align=right | 3.2 km || 
|-id=315 bgcolor=#E9E9E9
| 27315 || 2000 BC || — || January 16, 2000 || Višnjan Observatory || K. Korlević || — || align=right | 3.5 km || 
|-id=316 bgcolor=#fefefe
| 27316 ||  || — || January 27, 2000 || Oizumi || T. Kobayashi || NYS || align=right | 2.6 km || 
|-id=317 bgcolor=#fefefe
| 27317 ||  || — || January 27, 2000 || Oizumi || T. Kobayashi || — || align=right | 2.3 km || 
|-id=318 bgcolor=#E9E9E9
| 27318 ||  || — || January 26, 2000 || Kitt Peak || Spacewatch || — || align=right | 2.7 km || 
|-id=319 bgcolor=#fefefe
| 27319 ||  || — || January 28, 2000 || Kitt Peak || Spacewatch || NYS || align=right | 5.4 km || 
|-id=320 bgcolor=#fefefe
| 27320 Vellinga ||  ||  || January 30, 2000 || Catalina || CSS || MAS || align=right | 2.1 km || 
|-id=321 bgcolor=#E9E9E9
| 27321 ||  || — || February 4, 2000 || Oizumi || T. Kobayashi || — || align=right | 21 km || 
|-id=322 bgcolor=#E9E9E9
| 27322 ||  || — || February 2, 2000 || Socorro || LINEAR || — || align=right | 6.0 km || 
|-id=323 bgcolor=#E9E9E9
| 27323 Julianewman ||  ||  || February 2, 2000 || Socorro || LINEAR || — || align=right | 2.8 km || 
|-id=324 bgcolor=#E9E9E9
| 27324 ||  || — || February 2, 2000 || Socorro || LINEAR || — || align=right | 5.5 km || 
|-id=325 bgcolor=#E9E9E9
| 27325 ||  || — || February 2, 2000 || Socorro || LINEAR || — || align=right | 4.0 km || 
|-id=326 bgcolor=#E9E9E9
| 27326 Jimobrien ||  ||  || February 2, 2000 || Socorro || LINEAR || — || align=right | 4.0 km || 
|-id=327 bgcolor=#fefefe
| 27327 Lindaplante ||  ||  || February 3, 2000 || Socorro || LINEAR || — || align=right | 2.5 km || 
|-id=328 bgcolor=#fefefe
| 27328 Pohlonski ||  ||  || February 2, 2000 || Socorro || LINEAR || — || align=right | 2.5 km || 
|-id=329 bgcolor=#fefefe
| 27329 ||  || — || February 2, 2000 || Socorro || LINEAR || — || align=right | 2.4 km || 
|-id=330 bgcolor=#E9E9E9
| 27330 Markporter ||  ||  || February 2, 2000 || Socorro || LINEAR || — || align=right | 2.8 km || 
|-id=331 bgcolor=#E9E9E9
| 27331 ||  || — || February 5, 2000 || Socorro || LINEAR || EUN || align=right | 6.3 km || 
|-id=332 bgcolor=#E9E9E9
| 27332 Happritchard ||  ||  || February 2, 2000 || Socorro || LINEAR || — || align=right | 3.0 km || 
|-id=333 bgcolor=#E9E9E9
| 27333 ||  || — || February 4, 2000 || Socorro || LINEAR || DOR || align=right | 13 km || 
|-id=334 bgcolor=#E9E9E9
| 27334 ||  || — || February 4, 2000 || Socorro || LINEAR || — || align=right | 4.2 km || 
|-id=335 bgcolor=#E9E9E9
| 27335 ||  || — || February 4, 2000 || Socorro || LINEAR || — || align=right | 7.5 km || 
|-id=336 bgcolor=#fefefe
| 27336 Mikequinn ||  ||  || February 4, 2000 || Socorro || LINEAR || — || align=right | 2.1 km || 
|-id=337 bgcolor=#fefefe
| 27337 ||  || — || February 6, 2000 || Socorro || LINEAR || — || align=right | 2.4 km || 
|-id=338 bgcolor=#E9E9E9
| 27338 Malaraghavan ||  ||  || February 6, 2000 || Socorro || LINEAR || — || align=right | 4.3 km || 
|-id=339 bgcolor=#E9E9E9
| 27339 ||  || — || February 8, 2000 || Socorro || LINEAR || RAF || align=right | 4.9 km || 
|-id=340 bgcolor=#d6d6d6
| 27340 ||  || — || February 12, 2000 || Oaxaca || J. M. Roe || — || align=right | 12 km || 
|-id=341 bgcolor=#E9E9E9
| 27341 Fabiomuzzi ||  ||  || February 10, 2000 || Bologna || San Vittore Obs. || MAR || align=right | 3.1 km || 
|-id=342 bgcolor=#fefefe
| 27342 Joescanio ||  ||  || February 2, 2000 || Socorro || LINEAR || FLO || align=right | 1.8 km || 
|-id=343 bgcolor=#fefefe
| 27343 Deannashea ||  ||  || February 2, 2000 || Socorro || LINEAR || FLO || align=right | 2.9 km || 
|-id=344 bgcolor=#E9E9E9
| 27344 Vesevlada ||  ||  || February 26, 2000 || Ondřejov || L. Kotková || — || align=right | 2.8 km || 
|-id=345 bgcolor=#fefefe
| 27345 ||  || — || February 28, 2000 || Kitt Peak || Spacewatch || V || align=right | 2.0 km || 
|-id=346 bgcolor=#FFC2E0
| 27346 ||  || — || February 27, 2000 || Socorro || LINEAR || AMO +1kmfast? || align=right | 1.8 km || 
|-id=347 bgcolor=#fefefe
| 27347 Dworkin ||  ||  || February 25, 2000 || Catalina || CSS || — || align=right | 2.3 km || 
|-id=348 bgcolor=#fefefe
| 27348 Mink ||  ||  || February 26, 2000 || Catalina || CSS || V || align=right | 2.6 km || 
|-id=349 bgcolor=#E9E9E9
| 27349 Enos ||  ||  || February 26, 2000 || Catalina || CSS || — || align=right | 5.5 km || 
|-id=350 bgcolor=#fefefe
| 27350 ||  || — || February 29, 2000 || Socorro || LINEAR || NYS || align=right | 3.0 km || 
|-id=351 bgcolor=#FA8072
| 27351 ||  || — || February 29, 2000 || Socorro || LINEAR || — || align=right | 2.5 km || 
|-id=352 bgcolor=#fefefe
| 27352 ||  || — || February 29, 2000 || Socorro || LINEAR || — || align=right | 3.3 km || 
|-id=353 bgcolor=#fefefe
| 27353 Chrisspenner ||  ||  || February 29, 2000 || Socorro || LINEAR || — || align=right | 4.0 km || 
|-id=354 bgcolor=#fefefe
| 27354 Stiklaitis ||  ||  || February 29, 2000 || Socorro || LINEAR || NYS || align=right | 7.3 km || 
|-id=355 bgcolor=#E9E9E9
| 27355 ||  || — || February 29, 2000 || Socorro || LINEAR || EUN || align=right | 6.1 km || 
|-id=356 bgcolor=#fefefe
| 27356 Mattstrom ||  ||  || February 29, 2000 || Socorro || LINEAR || — || align=right | 3.7 km || 
|-id=357 bgcolor=#fefefe
| 27357 ||  || — || February 29, 2000 || Socorro || LINEAR || — || align=right | 3.2 km || 
|-id=358 bgcolor=#fefefe
| 27358 ||  || — || February 29, 2000 || Socorro || LINEAR || — || align=right | 2.8 km || 
|-id=359 bgcolor=#d6d6d6
| 27359 ||  || — || February 29, 2000 || Socorro || LINEAR || 7:4 || align=right | 20 km || 
|-id=360 bgcolor=#d6d6d6
| 27360 ||  || — || February 29, 2000 || Socorro || LINEAR || — || align=right | 17 km || 
|-id=361 bgcolor=#d6d6d6
| 27361 ||  || — || February 29, 2000 || Socorro || LINEAR || — || align=right | 14 km || 
|-id=362 bgcolor=#d6d6d6
| 27362 Morganroche || 2000 EO ||  || March 2, 2000 || Lake Tekapo || N. Brady || — || align=right | 6.4 km || 
|-id=363 bgcolor=#E9E9E9
| 27363 Alvanclark ||  ||  || March 1, 2000 || Catalina || CSS || PAD || align=right | 7.4 km || 
|-id=364 bgcolor=#d6d6d6
| 27364 ||  || — || March 3, 2000 || San Marcello || A. Boattini, G. Forti || KOR || align=right | 5.8 km || 
|-id=365 bgcolor=#fefefe
| 27365 Henryfitz ||  ||  || March 3, 2000 || Catalina || CSS || — || align=right | 2.6 km || 
|-id=366 bgcolor=#d6d6d6
| 27366 ||  || — || March 4, 2000 || Socorro || LINEAR || — || align=right | 9.0 km || 
|-id=367 bgcolor=#fefefe
| 27367 ||  || — || March 8, 2000 || Socorro || LINEAR || FLO || align=right | 3.0 km || 
|-id=368 bgcolor=#fefefe
| 27368 Raytesar ||  ||  || March 8, 2000 || Socorro || LINEAR || — || align=right | 2.7 km || 
|-id=369 bgcolor=#d6d6d6
| 27369 ||  || — || March 8, 2000 || Socorro || LINEAR || — || align=right | 8.4 km || 
|-id=370 bgcolor=#d6d6d6
| 27370 ||  || — || March 8, 2000 || Socorro || LINEAR || HYG || align=right | 11 km || 
|-id=371 bgcolor=#d6d6d6
| 27371 ||  || — || March 8, 2000 || Socorro || LINEAR || THM || align=right | 9.0 km || 
|-id=372 bgcolor=#d6d6d6
| 27372 Ujifusa ||  ||  || March 8, 2000 || Socorro || LINEAR || — || align=right | 6.6 km || 
|-id=373 bgcolor=#fefefe
| 27373 Davidvernon ||  ||  || March 9, 2000 || Socorro || LINEAR || — || align=right | 3.0 km || 
|-id=374 bgcolor=#d6d6d6
| 27374 Yim ||  ||  || March 9, 2000 || Socorro || LINEAR || KOR || align=right | 4.9 km || 
|-id=375 bgcolor=#fefefe
| 27375 Asirvatham ||  ||  || March 9, 2000 || Socorro || LINEAR || — || align=right | 3.2 km || 
|-id=376 bgcolor=#E9E9E9
| 27376 ||  || — || March 7, 2000 || Višnjan Observatory || K. Korlević || ADE || align=right | 5.1 km || 
|-id=377 bgcolor=#fefefe
| 27377 ||  || — || March 10, 2000 || Kitt Peak || Spacewatch || V || align=right | 1.9 km || 
|-id=378 bgcolor=#d6d6d6
| 27378 ||  || — || March 10, 2000 || Kitt Peak || Spacewatch || — || align=right | 9.0 km || 
|-id=379 bgcolor=#d6d6d6
| 27379 ||  || — || March 8, 2000 || Socorro || LINEAR || THM || align=right | 5.1 km || 
|-id=380 bgcolor=#fefefe
| 27380 ||  || — || March 10, 2000 || Socorro || LINEAR || — || align=right | 2.4 km || 
|-id=381 bgcolor=#E9E9E9
| 27381 Balasingam ||  ||  || March 10, 2000 || Socorro || LINEAR || — || align=right | 3.1 km || 
|-id=382 bgcolor=#fefefe
| 27382 Justinbarber ||  ||  || March 10, 2000 || Socorro || LINEAR || V || align=right | 1.9 km || 
|-id=383 bgcolor=#fefefe
| 27383 Braebenedict ||  ||  || March 5, 2000 || Socorro || LINEAR || — || align=right | 2.8 km || 
|-id=384 bgcolor=#fefefe
| 27384 Meaganbethel ||  ||  || March 5, 2000 || Socorro || LINEAR || — || align=right | 3.4 km || 
|-id=385 bgcolor=#fefefe
| 27385 Andblonsky ||  ||  || March 5, 2000 || Socorro || LINEAR || FLO || align=right | 2.7 km || 
|-id=386 bgcolor=#fefefe
| 27386 Chadcampbell ||  ||  || March 8, 2000 || Socorro || LINEAR || V || align=right | 2.2 km || 
|-id=387 bgcolor=#fefefe
| 27387 Chhabra ||  ||  || March 8, 2000 || Socorro || LINEAR || — || align=right | 4.0 km || 
|-id=388 bgcolor=#E9E9E9
| 27388 ||  || — || March 8, 2000 || Socorro || LINEAR || — || align=right | 5.0 km || 
|-id=389 bgcolor=#d6d6d6
| 27389 ||  || — || March 8, 2000 || Socorro || LINEAR || — || align=right | 4.9 km || 
|-id=390 bgcolor=#fefefe
| 27390 Kyledavis ||  ||  || March 8, 2000 || Socorro || LINEAR || — || align=right | 2.8 km || 
|-id=391 bgcolor=#fefefe
| 27391 ||  || — || March 9, 2000 || Socorro || LINEAR || — || align=right | 4.3 km || 
|-id=392 bgcolor=#fefefe
| 27392 Valerieding ||  ||  || March 9, 2000 || Socorro || LINEAR || — || align=right | 2.8 km || 
|-id=393 bgcolor=#fefefe
| 27393 ||  || — || March 9, 2000 || Socorro || LINEAR || V || align=right | 2.7 km || 
|-id=394 bgcolor=#d6d6d6
| 27394 ||  || — || March 9, 2000 || Socorro || LINEAR || — || align=right | 7.9 km || 
|-id=395 bgcolor=#E9E9E9
| 27395 ||  || — || March 9, 2000 || Socorro || LINEAR || EUN || align=right | 5.4 km || 
|-id=396 bgcolor=#d6d6d6
| 27396 Shuji ||  ||  || March 13, 2000 || Kuma Kogen || A. Nakamura || ALA || align=right | 24 km || 
|-id=397 bgcolor=#E9E9E9
| 27397 D'Souza ||  ||  || March 14, 2000 || Socorro || LINEAR || — || align=right | 3.8 km || 
|-id=398 bgcolor=#E9E9E9
| 27398 ||  || — || March 15, 2000 || Socorro || LINEAR || EUN || align=right | 4.6 km || 
|-id=399 bgcolor=#fefefe
| 27399 Gehring ||  ||  || March 11, 2000 || Anderson Mesa || LONEOS || — || align=right | 2.7 km || 
|-id=400 bgcolor=#E9E9E9
| 27400 Mikewong ||  ||  || March 11, 2000 || Anderson Mesa || LONEOS || EUN || align=right | 3.2 km || 
|}

27401–27500 

|-bgcolor=#fefefe
| 27401 ||  || — || March 6, 2000 || Haleakala || NEAT || — || align=right | 2.5 km || 
|-id=402 bgcolor=#d6d6d6
| 27402 ||  || — || March 8, 2000 || Socorro || LINEAR || EOS || align=right | 6.1 km || 
|-id=403 bgcolor=#E9E9E9
| 27403 ||  || — || March 8, 2000 || Haleakala || NEAT || — || align=right | 3.3 km || 
|-id=404 bgcolor=#d6d6d6
| 27404 ||  || — || March 9, 2000 || Socorro || LINEAR || — || align=right | 9.9 km || 
|-id=405 bgcolor=#E9E9E9
| 27405 Danielfeeny ||  ||  || March 9, 2000 || Socorro || LINEAR || — || align=right | 3.5 km || 
|-id=406 bgcolor=#d6d6d6
| 27406 ||  || — || March 9, 2000 || Socorro || LINEAR || — || align=right | 6.0 km || 
|-id=407 bgcolor=#E9E9E9
| 27407 Haodo ||  ||  || March 11, 2000 || Anderson Mesa || LONEOS || — || align=right | 4.7 km || 
|-id=408 bgcolor=#E9E9E9
| 27408 Kellyferguson ||  ||  || March 11, 2000 || Anderson Mesa || LONEOS || — || align=right | 3.4 km || 
|-id=409 bgcolor=#fefefe
| 27409 Addiedove ||  ||  || March 11, 2000 || Anderson Mesa || LONEOS || V || align=right | 2.4 km || 
|-id=410 bgcolor=#fefefe
| 27410 Grimmett ||  ||  || March 12, 2000 || Socorro || LINEAR || V || align=right | 1.9 km || 
|-id=411 bgcolor=#fefefe
| 27411 Laurenhall ||  ||  || March 13, 2000 || Socorro || LINEAR || V || align=right | 3.1 km || 
|-id=412 bgcolor=#fefefe
| 27412 Teague ||  ||  || March 10, 2000 || Catalina || R. Hill || — || align=right | 4.3 km || 
|-id=413 bgcolor=#fefefe
| 27413 Ambruster ||  ||  || March 11, 2000 || Catalina || CSS || — || align=right | 2.0 km || 
|-id=414 bgcolor=#E9E9E9
| 27414 ||  || — || March 12, 2000 || Catalina || CSS || GEF || align=right | 5.0 km || 
|-id=415 bgcolor=#fefefe
| 27415 ||  || — || March 3, 2000 || Catalina || CSS || — || align=right | 3.4 km || 
|-id=416 bgcolor=#fefefe
| 27416 ||  || — || March 4, 2000 || Catalina || CSS || V || align=right | 2.6 km || 
|-id=417 bgcolor=#d6d6d6
| 27417 Jessjohnson ||  ||  || March 4, 2000 || Catalina || CSS || — || align=right | 8.3 km || 
|-id=418 bgcolor=#d6d6d6
| 27418 ||  || — || March 6, 2000 || Haleakala || NEAT || — || align=right | 16 km || 
|-id=419 bgcolor=#E9E9E9
| 27419 ||  || — || March 6, 2000 || Haleakala || NEAT || — || align=right | 6.3 km || 
|-id=420 bgcolor=#E9E9E9
| 27420 Shontobegay ||  ||  || March 12, 2000 || Anderson Mesa || LONEOS || KRM || align=right | 7.2 km || 
|-id=421 bgcolor=#E9E9E9
| 27421 Nathanhan ||  ||  || March 3, 2000 || Socorro || LINEAR || — || align=right | 8.7 km || 
|-id=422 bgcolor=#E9E9E9
| 27422 Robheckman ||  ||  || March 5, 2000 || Socorro || LINEAR || — || align=right | 3.6 km || 
|-id=423 bgcolor=#fefefe
| 27423 Dennisbowers ||  ||  || March 3, 2000 || Catalina || CSS || V || align=right | 2.0 km || 
|-id=424 bgcolor=#fefefe
| 27424 ||  || — || March 1, 2000 || Kitt Peak || Spacewatch || — || align=right | 1.5 km || 
|-id=425 bgcolor=#fefefe
| 27425 Bakker ||  ||  || March 1, 2000 || Catalina || CSS || V || align=right | 2.2 km || 
|-id=426 bgcolor=#fefefe
| 27426 Brettlawrie ||  ||  || March 1, 2000 || Catalina || CSS || — || align=right | 2.8 km || 
|-id=427 bgcolor=#E9E9E9
| 27427 ||  || — || March 31, 2000 || Farpoint || Farpoint Obs. || — || align=right | 14 km || 
|-id=428 bgcolor=#fefefe
| 27428 ||  || — || March 29, 2000 || Oizumi || T. Kobayashi || — || align=right | 4.3 km || 
|-id=429 bgcolor=#fefefe
| 27429 ||  || — || March 28, 2000 || Farpoint || Farpoint Obs. || — || align=right | 3.6 km || 
|-id=430 bgcolor=#E9E9E9
| 27430 ||  || — || March 28, 2000 || Socorro || LINEAR || EUN || align=right | 4.2 km || 
|-id=431 bgcolor=#E9E9E9
| 27431 Jimcole ||  ||  || March 27, 2000 || Anderson Mesa || LONEOS || — || align=right | 4.1 km || 
|-id=432 bgcolor=#E9E9E9
| 27432 Kevinconley ||  ||  || March 27, 2000 || Anderson Mesa || LONEOS || — || align=right | 5.5 km || 
|-id=433 bgcolor=#d6d6d6
| 27433 Hylak ||  ||  || March 29, 2000 || Socorro || LINEAR || HYG || align=right | 7.7 km || 
|-id=434 bgcolor=#E9E9E9
| 27434 Anirudhjain ||  ||  || March 29, 2000 || Socorro || LINEAR || PAD || align=right | 7.0 km || 
|-id=435 bgcolor=#fefefe
| 27435 ||  || — || March 29, 2000 || Socorro || LINEAR || — || align=right | 4.6 km || 
|-id=436 bgcolor=#d6d6d6
| 27436 ||  || — || March 29, 2000 || Socorro || LINEAR || THM || align=right | 8.2 km || 
|-id=437 bgcolor=#fefefe
| 27437 ||  || — || March 29, 2000 || Socorro || LINEAR || V || align=right | 3.2 km || 
|-id=438 bgcolor=#E9E9E9
| 27438 Carolynjons ||  ||  || March 29, 2000 || Socorro || LINEAR || — || align=right | 6.9 km || 
|-id=439 bgcolor=#E9E9E9
| 27439 Kamimura ||  ||  || March 29, 2000 || Socorro || LINEAR || — || align=right | 2.9 km || 
|-id=440 bgcolor=#E9E9E9
| 27440 Colekendrick ||  ||  || March 29, 2000 || Socorro || LINEAR || — || align=right | 5.4 km || 
|-id=441 bgcolor=#E9E9E9
| 27441 ||  || — || March 29, 2000 || Socorro || LINEAR || — || align=right | 6.9 km || 
|-id=442 bgcolor=#d6d6d6
| 27442 ||  || — || March 30, 2000 || Socorro || LINEAR || — || align=right | 6.1 km || 
|-id=443 bgcolor=#d6d6d6
| 27443 ||  || — || March 30, 2000 || Socorro || LINEAR || — || align=right | 8.3 km || 
|-id=444 bgcolor=#d6d6d6
| 27444 ||  || — || March 30, 2000 || Socorro || LINEAR || — || align=right | 11 km || 
|-id=445 bgcolor=#E9E9E9
| 27445 Lynnlane ||  ||  || March 30, 2000 || Catalina || CSS || — || align=right | 2.9 km || 
|-id=446 bgcolor=#fefefe
| 27446 Landoni ||  ||  || March 29, 2000 || Socorro || LINEAR || — || align=right | 2.7 km || 
|-id=447 bgcolor=#fefefe
| 27447 Ichunlin ||  ||  || April 4, 2000 || Socorro || LINEAR || V || align=right | 3.3 km || 
|-id=448 bgcolor=#d6d6d6
| 27448 ||  || — || April 4, 2000 || Socorro || LINEAR || — || align=right | 5.5 km || 
|-id=449 bgcolor=#d6d6d6
| 27449 Jamarkley ||  ||  || April 5, 2000 || Socorro || LINEAR || KOR || align=right | 3.7 km || 
|-id=450 bgcolor=#E9E9E9
| 27450 Monzon ||  ||  || April 5, 2000 || Socorro || LINEAR || — || align=right | 4.0 km || 
|-id=451 bgcolor=#d6d6d6
| 27451 ||  || — || April 12, 2000 || Socorro || LINEAR || — || align=right | 9.1 km || 
|-id=452 bgcolor=#d6d6d6
| 27452 Nikhilpatel ||  ||  || April 5, 2000 || Socorro || LINEAR || THM || align=right | 7.6 km || 
|-id=453 bgcolor=#d6d6d6
| 27453 Crystalpoole ||  ||  || April 5, 2000 || Socorro || LINEAR || — || align=right | 5.9 km || 
|-id=454 bgcolor=#d6d6d6
| 27454 Samapaige ||  ||  || April 5, 2000 || Socorro || LINEAR || THM || align=right | 5.8 km || 
|-id=455 bgcolor=#fefefe
| 27455 ||  || — || April 5, 2000 || Socorro || LINEAR || NYS || align=right | 2.4 km || 
|-id=456 bgcolor=#E9E9E9
| 27456 Sarkisian ||  ||  || April 5, 2000 || Socorro || LINEAR || — || align=right | 3.1 km || 
|-id=457 bgcolor=#E9E9E9
| 27457 Tovinkere ||  ||  || April 5, 2000 || Socorro || LINEAR || — || align=right | 4.8 km || 
|-id=458 bgcolor=#d6d6d6
| 27458 Williamwhite ||  ||  || April 5, 2000 || Socorro || LINEAR || — || align=right | 7.5 km || 
|-id=459 bgcolor=#fefefe
| 27459 ||  || — || April 5, 2000 || Socorro || LINEAR || NYS || align=right | 2.4 km || 
|-id=460 bgcolor=#d6d6d6
| 27460 ||  || — || April 5, 2000 || Socorro || LINEAR || — || align=right | 3.5 km || 
|-id=461 bgcolor=#d6d6d6
| 27461 ||  || — || April 5, 2000 || Socorro || LINEAR || THM || align=right | 8.8 km || 
|-id=462 bgcolor=#E9E9E9
| 27462 ||  || — || April 5, 2000 || Socorro || LINEAR || — || align=right | 3.0 km || 
|-id=463 bgcolor=#fefefe
| 27463 ||  || — || April 5, 2000 || Socorro || LINEAR || — || align=right | 3.4 km || 
|-id=464 bgcolor=#d6d6d6
| 27464 ||  || — || April 5, 2000 || Socorro || LINEAR || KOR || align=right | 4.4 km || 
|-id=465 bgcolor=#E9E9E9
| 27465 Cambroziak ||  ||  || April 5, 2000 || Socorro || LINEAR || — || align=right | 3.5 km || 
|-id=466 bgcolor=#E9E9E9
| 27466 Cargibaysal ||  ||  || April 5, 2000 || Socorro || LINEAR || — || align=right | 3.7 km || 
|-id=467 bgcolor=#E9E9E9
| 27467 ||  || — || April 5, 2000 || Socorro || LINEAR || — || align=right | 3.3 km || 
|-id=468 bgcolor=#fefefe
| 27468 ||  || — || April 5, 2000 || Socorro || LINEAR || — || align=right | 5.8 km || 
|-id=469 bgcolor=#d6d6d6
| 27469 ||  || — || April 5, 2000 || Socorro || LINEAR || — || align=right | 5.6 km || 
|-id=470 bgcolor=#E9E9E9
| 27470 Debrabeckett ||  ||  || April 5, 2000 || Socorro || LINEAR || MRX || align=right | 3.2 km || 
|-id=471 bgcolor=#d6d6d6
| 27471 ||  || — || April 5, 2000 || Socorro || LINEAR || — || align=right | 8.5 km || 
|-id=472 bgcolor=#d6d6d6
| 27472 ||  || — || April 5, 2000 || Socorro || LINEAR || — || align=right | 9.4 km || 
|-id=473 bgcolor=#d6d6d6
| 27473 ||  || — || April 5, 2000 || Socorro || LINEAR || — || align=right | 9.9 km || 
|-id=474 bgcolor=#E9E9E9
| 27474 ||  || — || April 2, 2000 || Socorro || LINEAR || EUN || align=right | 4.1 km || 
|-id=475 bgcolor=#E9E9E9
| 27475 ||  || — || April 3, 2000 || Socorro || LINEAR || EUN || align=right | 3.3 km || 
|-id=476 bgcolor=#d6d6d6
| 27476 ||  || — || April 3, 2000 || Socorro || LINEAR || — || align=right | 16 km || 
|-id=477 bgcolor=#d6d6d6
| 27477 ||  || — || April 3, 2000 || Socorro || LINEAR || — || align=right | 17 km || 
|-id=478 bgcolor=#E9E9E9
| 27478 Kevinbloh ||  ||  || April 4, 2000 || Socorro || LINEAR || — || align=right | 2.9 km || 
|-id=479 bgcolor=#E9E9E9
| 27479 ||  || — || April 4, 2000 || Socorro || LINEAR || — || align=right | 5.3 km || 
|-id=480 bgcolor=#fefefe
| 27480 Heablonsky ||  ||  || April 4, 2000 || Socorro || LINEAR || — || align=right | 1.5 km || 
|-id=481 bgcolor=#d6d6d6
| 27481 ||  || — || April 4, 2000 || Socorro || LINEAR || EOS || align=right | 5.7 km || 
|-id=482 bgcolor=#E9E9E9
| 27482 ||  || — || April 4, 2000 || Socorro || LINEAR || MAR || align=right | 4.9 km || 
|-id=483 bgcolor=#d6d6d6
| 27483 ||  || — || April 5, 2000 || Socorro || LINEAR || EOS || align=right | 7.4 km || 
|-id=484 bgcolor=#d6d6d6
| 27484 ||  || — || April 5, 2000 || Socorro || LINEAR || — || align=right | 18 km || 
|-id=485 bgcolor=#d6d6d6
| 27485 ||  || — || April 5, 2000 || Socorro || LINEAR || — || align=right | 7.1 km || 
|-id=486 bgcolor=#d6d6d6
| 27486 ||  || — || April 6, 2000 || Socorro || LINEAR || EOS || align=right | 8.5 km || 
|-id=487 bgcolor=#E9E9E9
| 27487 ||  || — || April 6, 2000 || Socorro || LINEAR || — || align=right | 4.2 km || 
|-id=488 bgcolor=#d6d6d6
| 27488 ||  || — || April 7, 2000 || Socorro || LINEAR || — || align=right | 7.2 km || 
|-id=489 bgcolor=#E9E9E9
| 27489 ||  || — || April 7, 2000 || Socorro || LINEAR || MAR || align=right | 3.4 km || 
|-id=490 bgcolor=#E9E9E9
| 27490 ||  || — || April 7, 2000 || Socorro || LINEAR || — || align=right | 8.8 km || 
|-id=491 bgcolor=#d6d6d6
| 27491 Broksas ||  ||  || April 7, 2000 || Socorro || LINEAR || — || align=right | 9.0 km || 
|-id=492 bgcolor=#E9E9E9
| 27492 Susanduncan ||  ||  || April 7, 2000 || Socorro || LINEAR || — || align=right | 4.2 km || 
|-id=493 bgcolor=#E9E9E9
| 27493 Derikesibill ||  ||  || April 7, 2000 || Socorro || LINEAR || PAD || align=right | 6.9 km || 
|-id=494 bgcolor=#E9E9E9
| 27494 ||  || — || April 7, 2000 || Socorro || LINEAR || EUN || align=right | 4.4 km || 
|-id=495 bgcolor=#E9E9E9
| 27495 Heatherfennell ||  ||  || April 7, 2000 || Socorro || LINEAR || HOF || align=right | 8.3 km || 
|-id=496 bgcolor=#E9E9E9
| 27496 ||  || — || April 7, 2000 || Socorro || LINEAR || GER || align=right | 12 km || 
|-id=497 bgcolor=#d6d6d6
| 27497 ||  || — || April 7, 2000 || Socorro || LINEAR || TIR || align=right | 8.3 km || 
|-id=498 bgcolor=#d6d6d6
| 27498 ||  || — || April 7, 2000 || Socorro || LINEAR || — || align=right | 12 km || 
|-id=499 bgcolor=#d6d6d6
| 27499 ||  || — || April 7, 2000 || Socorro || LINEAR || — || align=right | 8.7 km || 
|-id=500 bgcolor=#d6d6d6
| 27500 Mandelbrot ||  ||  || April 12, 2000 || Prescott || P. G. Comba || THM || align=right | 11 km || 
|}

27501–27600 

|-bgcolor=#E9E9E9
| 27501 ||  || — || April 8, 2000 || Socorro || LINEAR || — || align=right | 3.4 km || 
|-id=502 bgcolor=#d6d6d6
| 27502 Stephbecca ||  ||  || April 3, 2000 || Anderson Mesa || L. H. Wasserman || KOR || align=right | 3.5 km || 
|-id=503 bgcolor=#E9E9E9
| 27503 Dankof ||  ||  || April 4, 2000 || Anderson Mesa || LONEOS || HEN || align=right | 2.7 km || 
|-id=504 bgcolor=#d6d6d6
| 27504 Denune ||  ||  || April 7, 2000 || Anderson Mesa || LONEOS || EOS || align=right | 5.5 km || 
|-id=505 bgcolor=#E9E9E9
| 27505 Catieblazek ||  ||  || April 7, 2000 || Anderson Mesa || LONEOS || — || align=right | 7.8 km || 
|-id=506 bgcolor=#fefefe
| 27506 Glassmeier ||  ||  || April 7, 2000 || Anderson Mesa || LONEOS || SUL || align=right | 5.9 km || 
|-id=507 bgcolor=#E9E9E9
| 27507 Travisbrown ||  ||  || April 7, 2000 || Anderson Mesa || LONEOS || — || align=right | 3.5 km || 
|-id=508 bgcolor=#d6d6d6
| 27508 Johncompton ||  ||  || April 7, 2000 || Anderson Mesa || LONEOS || EOS || align=right | 10 km || 
|-id=509 bgcolor=#d6d6d6
| 27509 Burcher ||  ||  || April 7, 2000 || Anderson Mesa || LONEOS || — || align=right | 6.4 km || 
|-id=510 bgcolor=#E9E9E9
| 27510 Lisaactor ||  ||  || April 7, 2000 || Anderson Mesa || LONEOS || — || align=right | 5.3 km || 
|-id=511 bgcolor=#fefefe
| 27511 Emiliedunham ||  ||  || April 6, 2000 || Anderson Mesa || LONEOS || V || align=right | 2.5 km || 
|-id=512 bgcolor=#fefefe
| 27512 Gilstrap ||  ||  || April 4, 2000 || Socorro || LINEAR || FLO || align=right | 2.2 km || 
|-id=513 bgcolor=#fefefe
| 27513 Mishapipe ||  ||  || April 4, 2000 || Anderson Mesa || LONEOS || — || align=right | 4.2 km || 
|-id=514 bgcolor=#d6d6d6
| 27514 Markov ||  ||  || April 26, 2000 || Prescott || P. G. Comba || KOR || align=right | 4.9 km || 
|-id=515 bgcolor=#fefefe
| 27515 Gunnels ||  ||  || April 27, 2000 || Socorro || LINEAR || NYS || align=right | 2.7 km || 
|-id=516 bgcolor=#d6d6d6
| 27516 ||  || — || April 27, 2000 || Socorro || LINEAR || THM || align=right | 7.3 km || 
|-id=517 bgcolor=#E9E9E9
| 27517 ||  || — || April 28, 2000 || Socorro || LINEAR || — || align=right | 6.4 km || 
|-id=518 bgcolor=#d6d6d6
| 27518 ||  || — || April 28, 2000 || Socorro || LINEAR || — || align=right | 12 km || 
|-id=519 bgcolor=#E9E9E9
| 27519 Miames ||  ||  || April 27, 2000 || Socorro || LINEAR || AGN || align=right | 3.5 km || 
|-id=520 bgcolor=#d6d6d6
| 27520 Rounds ||  ||  || April 24, 2000 || Anderson Mesa || LONEOS || — || align=right | 8.9 km || 
|-id=521 bgcolor=#d6d6d6
| 27521 Josschindler ||  ||  || April 24, 2000 || Anderson Mesa || LONEOS || KOR || align=right | 4.4 km || 
|-id=522 bgcolor=#E9E9E9
| 27522 Lenkenyon ||  ||  || April 27, 2000 || Socorro || LINEAR || — || align=right | 4.0 km || 
|-id=523 bgcolor=#d6d6d6
| 27523 ||  || — || April 28, 2000 || Socorro || LINEAR || — || align=right | 11 km || 
|-id=524 bgcolor=#E9E9E9
| 27524 Clousing ||  ||  || April 25, 2000 || Anderson Mesa || LONEOS || — || align=right | 4.7 km || 
|-id=525 bgcolor=#fefefe
| 27525 Vartovka ||  ||  || April 29, 2000 || Ondřejov || P. Pravec, P. Kušnirák || FLO || align=right | 3.0 km || 
|-id=526 bgcolor=#E9E9E9
| 27526 ||  || — || April 29, 2000 || Socorro || LINEAR || — || align=right | 5.3 km || 
|-id=527 bgcolor=#d6d6d6
| 27527 Kirkkoehler ||  ||  || April 29, 2000 || Socorro || LINEAR || KOR || align=right | 5.3 km || 
|-id=528 bgcolor=#d6d6d6
| 27528 ||  || — || April 29, 2000 || Socorro || LINEAR || — || align=right | 10 km || 
|-id=529 bgcolor=#fefefe
| 27529 Rhiannonmayne ||  ||  || April 26, 2000 || Anderson Mesa || LONEOS || V || align=right | 2.8 km || 
|-id=530 bgcolor=#d6d6d6
| 27530 Daveshuck ||  ||  || April 26, 2000 || Anderson Mesa || LONEOS || — || align=right | 8.8 km || 
|-id=531 bgcolor=#d6d6d6
| 27531 Sweaton ||  ||  || April 26, 2000 || Anderson Mesa || LONEOS || EOS || align=right | 6.6 km || 
|-id=532 bgcolor=#d6d6d6
| 27532 Buchwald-Wright ||  ||  || April 26, 2000 || Anderson Mesa || LONEOS || 615 || align=right | 6.1 km || 
|-id=533 bgcolor=#E9E9E9
| 27533 Johnbrucato ||  ||  || April 26, 2000 || Anderson Mesa || LONEOS || NEM || align=right | 7.0 km || 
|-id=534 bgcolor=#E9E9E9
| 27534 ||  || — || April 27, 2000 || Socorro || LINEAR || — || align=right | 4.2 km || 
|-id=535 bgcolor=#d6d6d6
| 27535 ||  || — || April 27, 2000 || Socorro || LINEAR || — || align=right | 4.1 km || 
|-id=536 bgcolor=#E9E9E9
| 27536 ||  || — || April 28, 2000 || Socorro || LINEAR || — || align=right | 4.0 km || 
|-id=537 bgcolor=#d6d6d6
| 27537 Dianaweintraub ||  ||  || April 30, 2000 || Anderson Mesa || LONEOS || — || align=right | 12 km || 
|-id=538 bgcolor=#fefefe
| 27538 ||  || — || April 29, 2000 || Socorro || LINEAR || — || align=right | 2.4 km || 
|-id=539 bgcolor=#fefefe
| 27539 Elmoutamid ||  ||  || April 27, 2000 || Anderson Mesa || LONEOS || V || align=right | 2.7 km || 
|-id=540 bgcolor=#E9E9E9
| 27540 Kevinwhite ||  ||  || April 27, 2000 || Anderson Mesa || LONEOS || — || align=right | 3.2 km || 
|-id=541 bgcolor=#d6d6d6
| 27541 ||  || — || May 3, 2000 || Socorro || LINEAR || — || align=right | 8.6 km || 
|-id=542 bgcolor=#E9E9E9
| 27542 ||  || — || May 3, 2000 || Socorro || LINEAR || PAD || align=right | 8.0 km || 
|-id=543 bgcolor=#d6d6d6
| 27543 ||  || — || May 6, 2000 || Socorro || LINEAR || — || align=right | 12 km || 
|-id=544 bgcolor=#d6d6d6
| 27544 ||  || — || May 6, 2000 || Socorro || LINEAR || — || align=right | 8.9 km || 
|-id=545 bgcolor=#E9E9E9
| 27545 ||  || — || May 5, 2000 || Socorro || LINEAR || GEF || align=right | 5.5 km || 
|-id=546 bgcolor=#fefefe
| 27546 Maryfran ||  ||  || May 5, 2000 || Socorro || LINEAR || — || align=right | 3.6 km || 
|-id=547 bgcolor=#d6d6d6
| 27547 ||  || — || May 6, 2000 || Socorro || LINEAR || — || align=right | 12 km || 
|-id=548 bgcolor=#E9E9E9
| 27548 ||  || — || May 7, 2000 || Socorro || LINEAR || — || align=right | 4.1 km || 
|-id=549 bgcolor=#E9E9E9
| 27549 Joannemichet ||  ||  || May 7, 2000 || Socorro || LINEAR || — || align=right | 4.2 km || 
|-id=550 bgcolor=#E9E9E9
| 27550 ||  || — || May 7, 2000 || Socorro || LINEAR || ADE || align=right | 10 km || 
|-id=551 bgcolor=#E9E9E9
| 27551 Pelayo ||  ||  || May 7, 2000 || Socorro || LINEAR || — || align=right | 3.4 km || 
|-id=552 bgcolor=#d6d6d6
| 27552 ||  || — || May 7, 2000 || Socorro || LINEAR || EOS || align=right | 9.3 km || 
|-id=553 bgcolor=#d6d6d6
| 27553 ||  || — || May 7, 2000 || Socorro || LINEAR || — || align=right | 8.0 km || 
|-id=554 bgcolor=#E9E9E9
| 27554 ||  || — || May 7, 2000 || Socorro || LINEAR || EUN || align=right | 4.7 km || 
|-id=555 bgcolor=#d6d6d6
| 27555 ||  || — || May 7, 2000 || Socorro || LINEAR || EOS || align=right | 9.1 km || 
|-id=556 bgcolor=#fefefe
| 27556 Williamprem ||  ||  || May 6, 2000 || Socorro || LINEAR || — || align=right | 4.3 km || 
|-id=557 bgcolor=#d6d6d6
| 27557 ||  || — || May 6, 2000 || Socorro || LINEAR || — || align=right | 11 km || 
|-id=558 bgcolor=#d6d6d6
| 27558 ||  || — || May 6, 2000 || Socorro || LINEAR || 7:4 || align=right | 8.4 km || 
|-id=559 bgcolor=#d6d6d6
| 27559 ||  || — || May 6, 2000 || Socorro || LINEAR || 7:4 || align=right | 14 km || 
|-id=560 bgcolor=#d6d6d6
| 27560 ||  || — || May 8, 2000 || Socorro || LINEAR || — || align=right | 5.3 km || 
|-id=561 bgcolor=#d6d6d6
| 27561 ||  || — || May 24, 2000 || Črni Vrh || Črni Vrh || 3:2 || align=right | 20 km || 
|-id=562 bgcolor=#d6d6d6
| 27562 Josephmarcus ||  ||  || May 27, 2000 || Anderson Mesa || LONEOS || — || align=right | 15 km || 
|-id=563 bgcolor=#d6d6d6
| 27563 Staceychristen ||  ||  || May 25, 2000 || Anderson Mesa || LONEOS || — || align=right | 5.3 km || 
|-id=564 bgcolor=#E9E9E9
| 27564 Astreichelt ||  ||  || May 27, 2000 || Socorro || LINEAR || GEF || align=right | 3.4 km || 
|-id=565 bgcolor=#d6d6d6
| 27565 ||  || — || May 24, 2000 || Anderson Mesa || LONEOS || 629 || align=right | 5.7 km || 
|-id=566 bgcolor=#E9E9E9
| 27566 ||  || — || June 4, 2000 || Socorro || LINEAR || GEF || align=right | 4.6 km || 
|-id=567 bgcolor=#d6d6d6
| 27567 ||  || — || July 24, 2000 || Socorro || LINEAR || — || align=right | 11 km || 
|-id=568 bgcolor=#fefefe
| 27568 ||  || — || August 4, 2000 || Socorro || LINEAR || Hmoon || align=right | 1.8 km || 
|-id=569 bgcolor=#d6d6d6
| 27569 ||  || — || August 25, 2000 || Socorro || LINEAR || — || align=right | 9.6 km || 
|-id=570 bgcolor=#E9E9E9
| 27570 Erinschumacher ||  ||  || August 25, 2000 || Socorro || LINEAR || — || align=right | 6.4 km || 
|-id=571 bgcolor=#E9E9E9
| 27571 Bobscott ||  ||  || August 31, 2000 || Socorro || LINEAR || — || align=right | 7.8 km || 
|-id=572 bgcolor=#d6d6d6
| 27572 Shurtleff ||  ||  || August 31, 2000 || Socorro || LINEAR || — || align=right | 7.2 km || 
|-id=573 bgcolor=#d6d6d6
| 27573 ||  || — || September 1, 2000 || Socorro || LINEAR || EOS || align=right | 4.1 km || 
|-id=574 bgcolor=#d6d6d6
| 27574 ||  || — || September 1, 2000 || Socorro || LINEAR || — || align=right | 5.7 km || 
|-id=575 bgcolor=#E9E9E9
| 27575 ||  || — || September 1, 2000 || Socorro || LINEAR || DOR || align=right | 12 km || 
|-id=576 bgcolor=#d6d6d6
| 27576 Denisespirou ||  ||  || September 2, 2000 || Socorro || LINEAR || KOR || align=right | 3.6 km || 
|-id=577 bgcolor=#E9E9E9
| 27577 ||  || — || September 8, 2000 || Socorro || LINEAR || EUN || align=right | 3.6 km || 
|-id=578 bgcolor=#E9E9E9
| 27578 Yogisullivan ||  ||  || September 23, 2000 || Socorro || LINEAR || WIT || align=right | 2.6 km || 
|-id=579 bgcolor=#E9E9E9
| 27579 ||  || — || October 3, 2000 || Socorro || LINEAR || EUN || align=right | 5.1 km || 
|-id=580 bgcolor=#E9E9E9
| 27580 Angelataylor ||  ||  || October 24, 2000 || Socorro || LINEAR || — || align=right | 2.9 km || 
|-id=581 bgcolor=#E9E9E9
| 27581 ||  || — || October 24, 2000 || Socorro || LINEAR || NEM || align=right | 6.5 km || 
|-id=582 bgcolor=#E9E9E9
| 27582 Jackieterrel ||  ||  || October 24, 2000 || Socorro || LINEAR || — || align=right | 3.1 km || 
|-id=583 bgcolor=#E9E9E9
| 27583 ||  || — || October 25, 2000 || Socorro || LINEAR || — || align=right | 4.4 km || 
|-id=584 bgcolor=#E9E9E9
| 27584 Barbaravelez ||  ||  || October 25, 2000 || Socorro || LINEAR || — || align=right | 3.4 km || 
|-id=585 bgcolor=#E9E9E9
| 27585 ||  || — || November 1, 2000 || Socorro || LINEAR || — || align=right | 3.4 km || 
|-id=586 bgcolor=#E9E9E9
| 27586 ||  || — || December 4, 2000 || Socorro || LINEAR || EUN || align=right | 3.7 km || 
|-id=587 bgcolor=#E9E9E9
| 27587 ||  || — || December 4, 2000 || Socorro || LINEAR || MAR || align=right | 4.6 km || 
|-id=588 bgcolor=#E9E9E9
| 27588 Wegley ||  ||  || December 22, 2000 || Socorro || LINEAR || HOF || align=right | 6.7 km || 
|-id=589 bgcolor=#E9E9E9
| 27589 Paigegentry ||  ||  || December 30, 2000 || Socorro || LINEAR || — || align=right | 2.4 km || 
|-id=590 bgcolor=#d6d6d6
| 27590 Koarimatsu ||  ||  || December 30, 2000 || Anderson Mesa || LONEOS || ALA || align=right | 13 km || 
|-id=591 bgcolor=#fefefe
| 27591 Rugilmartin ||  ||  || January 2, 2001 || Socorro || LINEAR || V || align=right | 1.6 km || 
|-id=592 bgcolor=#E9E9E9
| 27592 ||  || — || January 14, 2001 || Kvistaberg || UDAS || — || align=right | 4.0 km || 
|-id=593 bgcolor=#fefefe
| 27593 Oliviamarie ||  ||  || February 1, 2001 || Socorro || LINEAR || — || align=right | 2.0 km || 
|-id=594 bgcolor=#E9E9E9
| 27594 ||  || — || February 1, 2001 || Socorro || LINEAR || — || align=right | 3.7 km || 
|-id=595 bgcolor=#E9E9E9
| 27595 Hnath ||  ||  || February 13, 2001 || Socorro || LINEAR || — || align=right | 5.9 km || 
|-id=596 bgcolor=#d6d6d6
| 27596 Maldives || 2001 DH ||  || February 16, 2001 || Desert Beaver || W. K. Y. Yeung || — || align=right | 5.6 km || 
|-id=597 bgcolor=#fefefe
| 27597 Varuniyer ||  ||  || February 19, 2001 || Socorro || LINEAR || FLO || align=right | 2.5 km || 
|-id=598 bgcolor=#d6d6d6
| 27598 ||  || — || February 17, 2001 || Socorro || LINEAR || THM || align=right | 7.6 km || 
|-id=599 bgcolor=#fefefe
| 27599 ||  || — || March 18, 2001 || Socorro || LINEAR || — || align=right | 2.7 km || 
|-id=600 bgcolor=#d6d6d6
| 27600 ||  || — || March 18, 2001 || Socorro || LINEAR || — || align=right | 7.5 km || 
|}

27601–27700 

|-bgcolor=#fefefe
| 27601 ||  || — || March 19, 2001 || Socorro || LINEAR || H || align=right | 1.3 km || 
|-id=602 bgcolor=#fefefe
| 27602 Chaselewis ||  ||  || March 18, 2001 || Socorro || LINEAR || NYS || align=right | 1.6 km || 
|-id=603 bgcolor=#fefefe
| 27603 ||  || — || March 30, 2001 || Haleakala || NEAT || — || align=right | 2.4 km || 
|-id=604 bgcolor=#fefefe
| 27604 Affeldt ||  ||  || March 19, 2001 || Anderson Mesa || LONEOS || — || align=right | 2.1 km || 
|-id=605 bgcolor=#d6d6d6
| 27605 ||  || — || April 16, 2001 || Socorro || LINEAR || EOS || align=right | 6.2 km || 
|-id=606 bgcolor=#d6d6d6
| 27606 Davidli || 2001 KW ||  || May 17, 2001 || Socorro || LINEAR || — || align=right | 7.6 km || 
|-id=607 bgcolor=#fefefe
| 27607 ||  || — || May 17, 2001 || Socorro || LINEAR || — || align=right | 2.6 km || 
|-id=608 bgcolor=#d6d6d6
| 27608 ||  || — || May 18, 2001 || Socorro || LINEAR || — || align=right | 9.0 km || 
|-id=609 bgcolor=#E9E9E9
| 27609 ||  || — || May 18, 2001 || Socorro || LINEAR || — || align=right | 3.3 km || 
|-id=610 bgcolor=#E9E9E9
| 27610 Shixuanli ||  ||  || May 18, 2001 || Socorro || LINEAR || — || align=right | 3.0 km || 
|-id=611 bgcolor=#d6d6d6
| 27611 ||  || — || May 18, 2001 || Socorro || LINEAR || BRA || align=right | 2.9 km || 
|-id=612 bgcolor=#fefefe
| 27612 ||  || — || May 17, 2001 || Socorro || LINEAR || — || align=right | 2.9 km || 
|-id=613 bgcolor=#fefefe
| 27613 Annalou ||  ||  || May 21, 2001 || Socorro || LINEAR || — || align=right | 2.1 km || 
|-id=614 bgcolor=#E9E9E9
| 27614 ||  || — || May 18, 2001 || Socorro || LINEAR || EUN || align=right | 4.6 km || 
|-id=615 bgcolor=#fefefe
| 27615 Daniellu ||  ||  || May 22, 2001 || Socorro || LINEAR || — || align=right | 3.0 km || 
|-id=616 bgcolor=#E9E9E9
| 27616 ||  || — || May 22, 2001 || Socorro || LINEAR || — || align=right | 3.4 km || 
|-id=617 bgcolor=#E9E9E9
| 27617 ||  || — || May 22, 2001 || Socorro || LINEAR || — || align=right | 4.6 km || 
|-id=618 bgcolor=#fefefe
| 27618 Ceilierin ||  ||  || May 22, 2001 || Socorro || LINEAR || FLO || align=right | 2.7 km || 
|-id=619 bgcolor=#fefefe
| 27619 Ethanmessier ||  ||  || May 25, 2001 || Socorro || LINEAR || — || align=right | 2.8 km || 
|-id=620 bgcolor=#d6d6d6
| 27620 Kristenwalsh ||  ||  || May 18, 2001 || Anderson Mesa || LONEOS || — || align=right | 4.8 km || 
|-id=621 bgcolor=#d6d6d6
| 27621 ||  || — || May 26, 2001 || Palomar || NEAT || — || align=right | 10 km || 
|-id=622 bgcolor=#E9E9E9
| 27622 Richardbaker ||  ||  || May 24, 2001 || Anderson Mesa || LONEOS || — || align=right | 2.3 km || 
|-id=623 bgcolor=#E9E9E9
| 27623 || 2001 LE || — || June 3, 2001 || Haleakala || NEAT || — || align=right | 4.4 km || 
|-id=624 bgcolor=#d6d6d6
| 27624 ||  || — || June 19, 2001 || Palomar || NEAT || HYG || align=right | 8.7 km || 
|-id=625 bgcolor=#E9E9E9
| 27625 ||  || — || June 16, 2001 || Socorro || LINEAR || — || align=right | 4.7 km || 
|-id=626 bgcolor=#E9E9E9
| 27626 || 2001 NA || — || July 1, 2001 || Reedy Creek || J. Broughton || MIS || align=right | 6.4 km || 
|-id=627 bgcolor=#fefefe
| 27627 || 2038 P-L || — || September 24, 1960 || Palomar || PLS || V || align=right | 3.0 km || 
|-id=628 bgcolor=#E9E9E9
| 27628 || 2041 P-L || — || September 24, 1960 || Palomar || PLS || — || align=right | 3.5 km || 
|-id=629 bgcolor=#fefefe
| 27629 || 2054 P-L || — || September 26, 1960 || Palomar || PLS || — || align=right | 3.6 km || 
|-id=630 bgcolor=#fefefe
| 27630 || 2228 P-L || — || October 17, 1960 || Palomar || PLS || — || align=right | 1.8 km || 
|-id=631 bgcolor=#d6d6d6
| 27631 || 3106 P-L || — || September 24, 1960 || Palomar || PLS || EOS || align=right | 6.1 km || 
|-id=632 bgcolor=#fefefe
| 27632 || 3539 P-L || — || October 17, 1960 || Palomar || PLS || — || align=right | 2.7 km || 
|-id=633 bgcolor=#d6d6d6
| 27633 || 4005 P-L || — || September 24, 1960 || Palomar || PLS || — || align=right | 4.0 km || 
|-id=634 bgcolor=#fefefe
| 27634 || 4200 P-L || — || September 24, 1960 || Palomar || PLS || FLO || align=right | 1.7 km || 
|-id=635 bgcolor=#fefefe
| 27635 || 4528 P-L || — || September 24, 1960 || Palomar || PLS || NYS || align=right | 2.5 km || 
|-id=636 bgcolor=#fefefe
| 27636 || 4778 P-L || — || September 24, 1960 || Palomar || PLS || — || align=right | 2.8 km || 
|-id=637 bgcolor=#E9E9E9
| 27637 || 2070 T-1 || — || March 25, 1971 || Palomar || PLS || — || align=right | 3.0 km || 
|-id=638 bgcolor=#fefefe
| 27638 || 2287 T-1 || — || March 25, 1971 || Palomar || PLS || — || align=right | 2.8 km || 
|-id=639 bgcolor=#E9E9E9
| 27639 || 3156 T-1 || — || March 26, 1971 || Palomar || PLS || EUN || align=right | 2.9 km || 
|-id=640 bgcolor=#fefefe
| 27640 || 3273 T-1 || — || March 26, 1971 || Palomar || PLS || NYS || align=right | 2.6 km || 
|-id=641 bgcolor=#fefefe
| 27641 || 4131 T-1 || — || March 26, 1971 || Palomar || PLS || NYS || align=right | 2.4 km || 
|-id=642 bgcolor=#E9E9E9
| 27642 || 4281 T-1 || — || March 26, 1971 || Palomar || PLS || — || align=right | 2.7 km || 
|-id=643 bgcolor=#fefefe
| 27643 || 1093 T-2 || — || September 29, 1973 || Palomar || PLS || — || align=right | 1.7 km || 
|-id=644 bgcolor=#fefefe
| 27644 || 1343 T-2 || — || September 29, 1973 || Palomar || PLS || NYS || align=right | 2.6 km || 
|-id=645 bgcolor=#d6d6d6
| 27645 || 2074 T-2 || — || September 29, 1973 || Palomar || PLS || THM || align=right | 5.1 km || 
|-id=646 bgcolor=#fefefe
| 27646 || 2266 T-2 || — || September 29, 1973 || Palomar || PLS || — || align=right | 2.4 km || 
|-id=647 bgcolor=#E9E9E9
| 27647 || 2312 T-2 || — || September 29, 1973 || Palomar || PLS || — || align=right | 3.6 km || 
|-id=648 bgcolor=#fefefe
| 27648 || 3222 T-2 || — || September 30, 1973 || Palomar || PLS || — || align=right | 2.3 km || 
|-id=649 bgcolor=#d6d6d6
| 27649 || 3327 T-2 || — || September 25, 1973 || Palomar || PLS || — || align=right | 8.9 km || 
|-id=650 bgcolor=#E9E9E9
| 27650 || 5137 T-2 || — || September 25, 1973 || Palomar || PLS || — || align=right | 3.2 km || 
|-id=651 bgcolor=#fefefe
| 27651 || 2025 T-3 || — || October 16, 1977 || Palomar || PLS || FLO || align=right | 1.8 km || 
|-id=652 bgcolor=#fefefe
| 27652 || 2462 T-3 || — || October 16, 1977 || Palomar || PLS || NYS || align=right | 1.6 km || 
|-id=653 bgcolor=#E9E9E9
| 27653 || 4208 T-3 || — || October 16, 1977 || Palomar || PLS || — || align=right | 3.5 km || 
|-id=654 bgcolor=#E9E9E9
| 27654 || 5739 T-3 || — || October 16, 1977 || Palomar || PLS || — || align=right | 3.7 km || 
|-id=655 bgcolor=#E9E9E9
| 27655 || 1968 OK || — || July 18, 1968 || Cerro El Roble || C. Torres, S. Cofré || GER || align=right | 5.9 km || 
|-id=656 bgcolor=#d6d6d6
| 27656 ||  || — || July 26, 1974 || El Leoncito || M. R. Cesco || EOS || align=right | 9.8 km || 
|-id=657 bgcolor=#FA8072
| 27657 Berkhey || 1974 PC ||  || August 12, 1974 || Palomar || T. Gehrels || — || align=right | 2.7 km || 
|-id=658 bgcolor=#E9E9E9
| 27658 Dmitrijbagalej || 1978 RV ||  || September 1, 1978 || Nauchnij || N. S. Chernykh || — || align=right | 8.9 km || 
|-id=659 bgcolor=#fefefe
| 27659 Dolsky ||  ||  || September 26, 1978 || Nauchnij || L. V. Zhuravleva || NYS || align=right | 7.8 km || 
|-id=660 bgcolor=#E9E9E9
| 27660 Waterwayuni ||  ||  || October 2, 1978 || Nauchnij || L. V. Zhuravleva || DOR || align=right | 9.8 km || 
|-id=661 bgcolor=#fefefe
| 27661 ||  || — || October 27, 1978 || Palomar || C. M. Olmstead || — || align=right | 4.5 km || 
|-id=662 bgcolor=#fefefe
| 27662 ||  || — || October 27, 1978 || Palomar || C. M. Olmstead || NYS || align=right | 4.2 km || 
|-id=663 bgcolor=#d6d6d6
| 27663 ||  || — || November 7, 1978 || Palomar || E. F. Helin, S. J. Bus || KOR || align=right | 3.9 km || 
|-id=664 bgcolor=#fefefe
| 27664 ||  || — || November 6, 1978 || Palomar || E. F. Helin, S. J. Bus || FLO || align=right | 3.3 km || 
|-id=665 bgcolor=#d6d6d6
| 27665 ||  || — || November 7, 1978 || Palomar || E. F. Helin, S. J. Bus || — || align=right | 7.2 km || 
|-id=666 bgcolor=#fefefe
| 27666 ||  || — || November 7, 1978 || Palomar || E. F. Helin, S. J. Bus || NYS || align=right | 2.2 km || 
|-id=667 bgcolor=#d6d6d6
| 27667 || 1979 KJ || — || May 19, 1979 || La Silla || R. M. West || EOS || align=right | 7.8 km || 
|-id=668 bgcolor=#E9E9E9
| 27668 ||  || — || June 25, 1979 || Siding Spring || E. F. Helin, S. J. Bus || — || align=right | 5.8 km || 
|-id=669 bgcolor=#d6d6d6
| 27669 ||  || — || June 25, 1979 || Siding Spring || E. F. Helin, S. J. Bus || EOS || align=right | 7.4 km || 
|-id=670 bgcolor=#fefefe
| 27670 ||  || — || June 25, 1979 || Siding Spring || E. F. Helin, S. J. Bus || NYS || align=right | 3.4 km || 
|-id=671 bgcolor=#E9E9E9
| 27671 ||  || — || June 25, 1979 || Siding Spring || E. F. Helin, S. J. Bus || — || align=right | 2.8 km || 
|-id=672 bgcolor=#fefefe
| 27672 ||  || — || March 16, 1980 || La Silla || C.-I. Lagerkvist || — || align=right | 2.7 km || 
|-id=673 bgcolor=#E9E9E9
| 27673 ||  || — || October 31, 1980 || Palomar || S. J. Bus || — || align=right | 4.1 km || 
|-id=674 bgcolor=#fefefe
| 27674 ||  || — || October 31, 1980 || Palomar || S. J. Bus || — || align=right | 2.8 km || 
|-id=675 bgcolor=#fefefe
| 27675 Paulmaley || 1981 CH ||  || February 2, 1981 || Kleť || L. Brožek || PHOmoon || align=right | 5.1 km || 
|-id=676 bgcolor=#fefefe
| 27676 ||  || — || February 28, 1981 || Siding Spring || S. J. Bus || — || align=right | 3.3 km || 
|-id=677 bgcolor=#fefefe
| 27677 ||  || — || March 2, 1981 || Siding Spring || S. J. Bus || — || align=right | 2.5 km || 
|-id=678 bgcolor=#E9E9E9
| 27678 ||  || — || March 2, 1981 || Siding Spring || S. J. Bus || GEF || align=right | 4.3 km || 
|-id=679 bgcolor=#E9E9E9
| 27679 ||  || — || March 2, 1981 || Siding Spring || S. J. Bus || GEF || align=right | 3.6 km || 
|-id=680 bgcolor=#E9E9E9
| 27680 ||  || — || March 1, 1981 || Siding Spring || S. J. Bus || — || align=right | 5.4 km || 
|-id=681 bgcolor=#E9E9E9
| 27681 ||  || — || March 1, 1981 || Siding Spring || S. J. Bus || PAD || align=right | 7.2 km || 
|-id=682 bgcolor=#fefefe
| 27682 ||  || — || March 6, 1981 || Siding Spring || S. J. Bus || FLO || align=right | 1.8 km || 
|-id=683 bgcolor=#fefefe
| 27683 ||  || — || March 2, 1981 || Siding Spring || S. J. Bus || ERI || align=right | 5.1 km || 
|-id=684 bgcolor=#E9E9E9
| 27684 ||  || — || March 2, 1981 || Siding Spring || S. J. Bus || — || align=right | 3.5 km || 
|-id=685 bgcolor=#E9E9E9
| 27685 ||  || — || March 2, 1981 || Siding Spring || S. J. Bus || — || align=right | 4.0 km || 
|-id=686 bgcolor=#E9E9E9
| 27686 ||  || — || March 2, 1981 || Siding Spring || S. J. Bus || EUN || align=right | 4.7 km || 
|-id=687 bgcolor=#d6d6d6
| 27687 ||  || — || March 3, 1981 || Siding Spring || S. J. Bus || — || align=right | 11 km || 
|-id=688 bgcolor=#E9E9E9
| 27688 ||  || — || March 7, 1981 || Siding Spring || S. J. Bus || — || align=right | 2.8 km || 
|-id=689 bgcolor=#fefefe
| 27689 ||  || — || March 2, 1981 || Siding Spring || S. J. Bus || — || align=right | 3.5 km || 
|-id=690 bgcolor=#E9E9E9
| 27690 ||  || — || March 2, 1981 || Siding Spring || S. J. Bus || — || align=right | 3.9 km || 
|-id=691 bgcolor=#E9E9E9
| 27691 ||  || — || March 1, 1981 || Siding Spring || S. J. Bus || — || align=right | 6.3 km || 
|-id=692 bgcolor=#E9E9E9
| 27692 ||  || — || March 1, 1981 || Siding Spring || S. J. Bus || — || align=right | 5.0 km || 
|-id=693 bgcolor=#fefefe
| 27693 ||  || — || March 1, 1981 || Siding Spring || S. J. Bus || — || align=right | 2.2 km || 
|-id=694 bgcolor=#E9E9E9
| 27694 ||  || — || March 2, 1981 || Siding Spring || S. J. Bus || — || align=right | 5.3 km || 
|-id=695 bgcolor=#E9E9E9
| 27695 ||  || — || March 7, 1981 || Siding Spring || S. J. Bus || WIT || align=right | 2.4 km || 
|-id=696 bgcolor=#d6d6d6
| 27696 ||  || — || March 2, 1981 || Siding Spring || S. J. Bus || THM || align=right | 7.2 km || 
|-id=697 bgcolor=#E9E9E9
| 27697 ||  || — || March 1, 1981 || Siding Spring || S. J. Bus || — || align=right | 3.0 km || 
|-id=698 bgcolor=#fefefe
| 27698 ||  || — || March 2, 1981 || Siding Spring || S. J. Bus || — || align=right | 1.8 km || 
|-id=699 bgcolor=#fefefe
| 27699 ||  || — || May 15, 1982 || Palomar || Palomar Obs. || — || align=right | 5.6 km || 
|-id=700 bgcolor=#fefefe
| 27700 ||  || — || September 28, 1982 || Palomar || J. Gibson || — || align=right | 2.9 km || 
|}

27701–27800 

|-bgcolor=#fefefe
| 27701 || 1983 QR || — || August 30, 1983 || Palomar || J. Gibson || — || align=right | 1.4 km || 
|-id=702 bgcolor=#E9E9E9
| 27702 ||  || — || September 27, 1984 || Kleť || A. Mrkos || — || align=right | 8.9 km || 
|-id=703 bgcolor=#fefefe
| 27703 ||  || — || September 29, 1984 || Kleť || A. Mrkos || FLO || align=right | 5.4 km || 
|-id=704 bgcolor=#E9E9E9
| 27704 ||  || — || November 27, 1984 || Caussols || CERGA || HNS || align=right | 5.7 km || 
|-id=705 bgcolor=#E9E9E9
| 27705 ||  || — || February 16, 1985 || La Silla || H. Debehogne || — || align=right | 4.6 km || 
|-id=706 bgcolor=#d6d6d6
| 27706 Strogen ||  ||  || October 11, 1985 || Palomar || C. S. Shoemaker, E. M. Shoemaker || — || align=right | 11 km || 
|-id=707 bgcolor=#fefefe
| 27707 ||  || — || August 31, 1986 || La Silla || H. Debehogne || NYS || align=right | 4.4 km || 
|-id=708 bgcolor=#fefefe
| 27708 || 1987 WP || — || November 20, 1987 || Palomar || J. Alu, E. F. Helin || PHO || align=right | 6.2 km || 
|-id=709 bgcolor=#d6d6d6
| 27709 Orenburg ||  ||  || February 13, 1988 || La Silla || E. W. Elst || EOS || align=right | 8.1 km || 
|-id=710 bgcolor=#fefefe
| 27710 Henseling ||  ||  || September 7, 1988 || Tautenburg Observatory || F. Börngen || — || align=right | 1.7 km || 
|-id=711 bgcolor=#fefefe
| 27711 Kirschvink ||  ||  || November 4, 1988 || Palomar || C. S. Shoemaker, E. M. Shoemaker || PHO || align=right | 3.3 km || 
|-id=712 bgcolor=#fefefe
| 27712 Coudray ||  ||  || November 3, 1988 || Tautenburg Observatory || F. Börngen || — || align=right | 2.5 km || 
|-id=713 bgcolor=#fefefe
| 27713 || 1989 AA || — || January 2, 1989 || Palomar || E. F. Helin || H || align=right | 2.5 km || 
|-id=714 bgcolor=#fefefe
| 27714 Dochu || 1989 BR ||  || January 29, 1989 || Tokushima || M. Iwamoto, T. Furuta || FLO || align=right | 3.0 km || 
|-id=715 bgcolor=#fefefe
| 27715 ||  || — || February 5, 1989 || Gekko || Y. Oshima || KLI || align=right | 6.4 km || 
|-id=716 bgcolor=#d6d6d6
| 27716 Nobuyuki ||  ||  || February 13, 1989 || Geisei || T. Seki || — || align=right | 6.3 km || 
|-id=717 bgcolor=#fefefe
| 27717 ||  || — || February 4, 1989 || La Silla || E. W. Elst || V || align=right | 2.3 km || 
|-id=718 bgcolor=#fefefe
| 27718 Gouda ||  ||  || April 2, 1989 || La Silla || E. W. Elst || — || align=right | 3.1 km || 
|-id=719 bgcolor=#d6d6d6
| 27719 Fast ||  ||  || September 26, 1989 || La Silla || E. W. Elst || 7:4 || align=right | 15 km || 
|-id=720 bgcolor=#E9E9E9
| 27720 ||  || — || October 26, 1989 || Palomar || E. F. Helin || EUN || align=right | 2.8 km || 
|-id=721 bgcolor=#E9E9E9
| 27721 || 1989 WJ || — || November 20, 1989 || Gekko || Y. Oshima || — || align=right | 6.2 km || 
|-id=722 bgcolor=#d6d6d6
| 27722 ||  || — || July 29, 1990 || Palomar || H. E. Holt || — || align=right | 7.1 km || 
|-id=723 bgcolor=#d6d6d6
| 27723 || 1990 QA || — || August 19, 1990 || Siding Spring || R. H. McNaught || — || align=right | 18 km || 
|-id=724 bgcolor=#fefefe
| 27724 Jeannoel ||  ||  || August 21, 1990 || Haute Provence || E. W. Elst || — || align=right | 3.0 km || 
|-id=725 bgcolor=#fefefe
| 27725 ||  || — || August 23, 1990 || Palomar || H. E. Holt || V || align=right | 5.3 km || 
|-id=726 bgcolor=#d6d6d6
| 27726 ||  || — || August 29, 1990 || Palomar || H. E. Holt || — || align=right | 9.6 km || 
|-id=727 bgcolor=#fefefe
| 27727 ||  || — || August 20, 1990 || La Silla || E. W. Elst || V || align=right | 2.6 km || 
|-id=728 bgcolor=#d6d6d6
| 27728 ||  || — || August 16, 1990 || La Silla || E. W. Elst || HYG || align=right | 9.6 km || 
|-id=729 bgcolor=#fefefe
| 27729 ||  || — || August 16, 1990 || La Silla || E. W. Elst || V || align=right | 2.1 km || 
|-id=730 bgcolor=#d6d6d6
| 27730 ||  || — || August 26, 1990 || Palomar || H. E. Holt || URS || align=right | 13 km || 
|-id=731 bgcolor=#fefefe
| 27731 ||  || — || September 14, 1990 || Palomar || H. E. Holt || NYS || align=right | 1.9 km || 
|-id=732 bgcolor=#d6d6d6
| 27732 ||  || — || September 13, 1990 || La Silla || H. Debehogne || THM || align=right | 5.5 km || 
|-id=733 bgcolor=#d6d6d6
| 27733 ||  || — || September 13, 1990 || La Silla || H. Debehogne || THM || align=right | 7.2 km || 
|-id=734 bgcolor=#fefefe
| 27734 ||  || — || September 14, 1990 || La Silla || H. Debehogne || NYS || align=right | 3.8 km || 
|-id=735 bgcolor=#d6d6d6
| 27735 ||  || — || September 22, 1990 || La Silla || E. W. Elst || — || align=right | 10 km || 
|-id=736 bgcolor=#d6d6d6
| 27736 Ekaterinburg ||  ||  || September 22, 1990 || La Silla || E. W. Elst || — || align=right | 17 km || 
|-id=737 bgcolor=#fefefe
| 27737 ||  || — || September 22, 1990 || La Silla || E. W. Elst || NYS || align=right | 3.3 km || 
|-id=738 bgcolor=#d6d6d6
| 27738 ||  || — || October 9, 1990 || Siding Spring || R. H. McNaught || LIX || align=right | 15 km || 
|-id=739 bgcolor=#fefefe
| 27739 Kimihiro || 1990 UV ||  || October 17, 1990 || Geisei || T. Seki || V || align=right | 2.2 km || 
|-id=740 bgcolor=#fefefe
| 27740 Obatomoyuki ||  ||  || October 20, 1990 || Geisei || T. Seki || — || align=right | 4.7 km || 
|-id=741 bgcolor=#fefefe
| 27741 ||  || — || October 16, 1990 || La Silla || E. W. Elst || — || align=right | 6.7 km || 
|-id=742 bgcolor=#fefefe
| 27742 ||  || — || October 16, 1990 || La Silla || E. W. Elst || — || align=right | 5.0 km || 
|-id=743 bgcolor=#d6d6d6
| 27743 || 1990 VM || — || November 8, 1990 || Siding Spring || R. H. McNaught || — || align=right | 14 km || 
|-id=744 bgcolor=#fefefe
| 27744 ||  || — || November 15, 1990 || La Silla || E. W. Elst || — || align=right | 2.3 km || 
|-id=745 bgcolor=#fefefe
| 27745 || 1990 WS || — || November 18, 1990 || La Silla || E. W. Elst || V || align=right | 2.1 km || 
|-id=746 bgcolor=#fefefe
| 27746 ||  || — || November 18, 1990 || La Silla || E. W. Elst || — || align=right | 4.9 km || 
|-id=747 bgcolor=#d6d6d6
| 27747 || 1990 YW || — || December 18, 1990 || Palomar || E. F. Helin || — || align=right | 9.6 km || 
|-id=748 bgcolor=#fefefe
| 27748 Vivianhoette || 1991 AL ||  || January 9, 1991 || Yatsugatake || S. Izumikawa, O. Muramatsu || — || align=right | 4.5 km || 
|-id=749 bgcolor=#E9E9E9
| 27749 ||  || — || January 23, 1991 || Kitami || K. Endate, K. Watanabe || — || align=right | 3.4 km || 
|-id=750 bgcolor=#fefefe
| 27750 ||  || — || February 14, 1991 || Palomar || E. F. Helin || — || align=right | 4.2 km || 
|-id=751 bgcolor=#E9E9E9
| 27751 ||  || — || March 20, 1991 || La Silla || H. Debehogne || — || align=right | 3.3 km || 
|-id=752 bgcolor=#E9E9E9
| 27752 ||  || — || April 8, 1991 || La Silla || E. W. Elst || — || align=right | 5.3 km || 
|-id=753 bgcolor=#fefefe
| 27753 ||  || — || August 3, 1991 || La Silla || E. W. Elst || FLO || align=right | 2.7 km || 
|-id=754 bgcolor=#E9E9E9
| 27754 ||  || — || August 5, 1991 || Palomar || H. E. Holt || DOR || align=right | 11 km || 
|-id=755 bgcolor=#fefefe
| 27755 ||  || — || August 7, 1991 || Palomar || H. E. Holt || — || align=right | 2.7 km || 
|-id=756 bgcolor=#fefefe
| 27756 ||  || — || August 6, 1991 || Palomar || H. E. Holt || FLO || align=right | 1.6 km || 
|-id=757 bgcolor=#fefefe
| 27757 ||  || — || August 7, 1991 || Palomar || H. E. Holt || — || align=right | 3.6 km || 
|-id=758 bgcolor=#d6d6d6
| 27758 Michelson ||  ||  || September 12, 1991 || Tautenburg Observatory || F. Börngen, L. D. Schmadel || — || align=right | 5.3 km || 
|-id=759 bgcolor=#d6d6d6
| 27759 ||  || — || September 13, 1991 || Palomar || H. E. Holt || EOS || align=right | 8.6 km || 
|-id=760 bgcolor=#fefefe
| 27760 ||  || — || September 2, 1991 || Siding Spring || R. H. McNaught || FLO || align=right | 2.2 km || 
|-id=761 bgcolor=#fefefe
| 27761 ||  || — || September 13, 1991 || Palomar || H. E. Holt || — || align=right | 2.4 km || 
|-id=762 bgcolor=#fefefe
| 27762 ||  || — || September 15, 1991 || Palomar || H. E. Holt || FLO || align=right | 1.7 km || 
|-id=763 bgcolor=#fefefe
| 27763 ||  || — || September 15, 1991 || Palomar || H. E. Holt || — || align=right | 2.2 km || 
|-id=764 bgcolor=#d6d6d6
| 27764 von Flüe ||  ||  || September 10, 1991 || Tautenburg Observatory || F. Börngen || — || align=right | 5.7 km || 
|-id=765 bgcolor=#fefefe
| 27765 Brockhaus ||  ||  || September 10, 1991 || Tautenburg Observatory || F. Börngen || V || align=right | 2.6 km || 
|-id=766 bgcolor=#fefefe
| 27766 || 1991 TO || — || October 1, 1991 || Siding Spring || R. H. McNaught || — || align=right | 2.2 km || 
|-id=767 bgcolor=#d6d6d6
| 27767 || 1991 TP || — || October 1, 1991 || Siding Spring || R. H. McNaught || — || align=right | 13 km || 
|-id=768 bgcolor=#fefefe
| 27768 ||  || — || October 29, 1991 || Kushiro || S. Ueda, H. Kaneda || — || align=right | 2.5 km || 
|-id=769 bgcolor=#d6d6d6
| 27769 ||  || — || October 31, 1991 || Kushiro || S. Ueda, H. Kaneda || — || align=right | 6.0 km || 
|-id=770 bgcolor=#fefefe
| 27770 ||  || — || November 4, 1991 || Kushiro || S. Ueda, H. Kaneda || — || align=right | 3.7 km || 
|-id=771 bgcolor=#fefefe
| 27771 ||  || — || November 5, 1991 || Dynic || A. Sugie || — || align=right | 4.0 km || 
|-id=772 bgcolor=#d6d6d6
| 27772 ||  || — || November 2, 1991 || La Silla || E. W. Elst || — || align=right | 8.4 km || 
|-id=773 bgcolor=#fefefe
| 27773 ||  || — || November 4, 1991 || Kitt Peak || Spacewatch || — || align=right | 2.1 km || 
|-id=774 bgcolor=#fefefe
| 27774 ||  || — || December 29, 1991 || Haute Provence || E. W. Elst || — || align=right | 5.8 km || 
|-id=775 bgcolor=#fefefe
| 27775 Lilialmanzor ||  ||  || February 2, 1992 || La Silla || E. W. Elst || V || align=right | 4.2 km || 
|-id=776 bgcolor=#fefefe
| 27776 Cortland ||  ||  || February 25, 1992 || Palomar || C. S. Shoemaker, D. H. Levy || H || align=right | 3.0 km || 
|-id=777 bgcolor=#fefefe
| 27777 ||  || — || February 25, 1992 || Kitt Peak || Spacewatch || — || align=right | 2.7 km || 
|-id=778 bgcolor=#fefefe
| 27778 ||  || — || February 29, 1992 || La Silla || UESAC || NYS || align=right | 4.5 km || 
|-id=779 bgcolor=#fefefe
| 27779 ||  || — || February 29, 1992 || La Silla || UESAC || — || align=right | 5.9 km || 
|-id=780 bgcolor=#fefefe
| 27780 ||  || — || March 1, 1992 || La Silla || UESAC || — || align=right | 2.8 km || 
|-id=781 bgcolor=#fefefe
| 27781 ||  || — || March 1, 1992 || La Silla || UESAC || FLO || align=right | 2.5 km || 
|-id=782 bgcolor=#fefefe
| 27782 ||  || — || March 2, 1992 || La Silla || UESAC || — || align=right | 2.2 km || 
|-id=783 bgcolor=#E9E9E9
| 27783 ||  || — || April 4, 1992 || La Silla || E. W. Elst || — || align=right | 4.4 km || 
|-id=784 bgcolor=#E9E9E9
| 27784 || 1992 OE || — || July 27, 1992 || Siding Spring || R. H. McNaught || — || align=right | 4.2 km || 
|-id=785 bgcolor=#E9E9E9
| 27785 ||  || — || July 26, 1992 || La Silla || E. W. Elst || VIB || align=right | 5.7 km || 
|-id=786 bgcolor=#E9E9E9
| 27786 ||  || — || August 8, 1992 || Caussols || E. W. Elst || EUN || align=right | 4.8 km || 
|-id=787 bgcolor=#E9E9E9
| 27787 ||  || — || October 28, 1992 || Kitami || K. Endate, K. Watanabe || DOR || align=right | 9.5 km || 
|-id=788 bgcolor=#d6d6d6
| 27788 || 1993 AS || — || January 13, 1993 || Kushiro || S. Ueda, H. Kaneda || ALA || align=right | 13 km || 
|-id=789 bgcolor=#d6d6d6
| 27789 Astrakhan ||  ||  || January 23, 1993 || La Silla || E. W. Elst || EOS || align=right | 9.4 km || 
|-id=790 bgcolor=#d6d6d6
| 27790 Urashimataro ||  ||  || February 13, 1993 || Geisei || T. Seki || VER || align=right | 11 km || 
|-id=791 bgcolor=#fefefe
| 27791 Masaru ||  ||  || February 24, 1993 || Yatsugatake || Y. Kushida, O. Muramatsu || FLO || align=right | 3.1 km || 
|-id=792 bgcolor=#d6d6d6
| 27792 Fridakahlo ||  ||  || February 20, 1993 || Caussols || E. W. Elst || EOS || align=right | 8.9 km || 
|-id=793 bgcolor=#fefefe
| 27793 ||  || — || March 25, 1993 || Kushiro || S. Ueda, H. Kaneda || V || align=right | 3.2 km || 
|-id=794 bgcolor=#fefefe
| 27794 ||  || — || March 17, 1993 || La Silla || UESAC || FLO || align=right | 1.7 km || 
|-id=795 bgcolor=#fefefe
| 27795 ||  || — || March 17, 1993 || La Silla || UESAC || — || align=right | 2.8 km || 
|-id=796 bgcolor=#fefefe
| 27796 ||  || — || March 17, 1993 || La Silla || UESAC || V || align=right | 2.6 km || 
|-id=797 bgcolor=#fefefe
| 27797 ||  || — || March 17, 1993 || La Silla || UESAC || FLO || align=right | 2.2 km || 
|-id=798 bgcolor=#E9E9E9
| 27798 ||  || — || March 17, 1993 || La Silla || UESAC || — || align=right | 3.6 km || 
|-id=799 bgcolor=#fefefe
| 27799 ||  || — || March 21, 1993 || La Silla || UESAC || V || align=right | 2.2 km || 
|-id=800 bgcolor=#fefefe
| 27800 ||  || — || March 21, 1993 || La Silla || UESAC || — || align=right | 2.2 km || 
|}

27801–27900 

|-bgcolor=#fefefe
| 27801 ||  || — || March 21, 1993 || La Silla || UESAC || — || align=right | 2.1 km || 
|-id=802 bgcolor=#d6d6d6
| 27802 ||  || — || March 19, 1993 || La Silla || UESAC || TIR || align=right | 7.8 km || 
|-id=803 bgcolor=#d6d6d6
| 27803 ||  || — || March 19, 1993 || La Silla || UESAC || THM || align=right | 9.3 km || 
|-id=804 bgcolor=#fefefe
| 27804 ||  || — || March 19, 1993 || La Silla || UESAC || V || align=right | 1.7 km || 
|-id=805 bgcolor=#fefefe
| 27805 ||  || — || March 19, 1993 || La Silla || UESAC || V || align=right | 3.0 km || 
|-id=806 bgcolor=#fefefe
| 27806 ||  || — || March 19, 1993 || La Silla || UESAC || FLO || align=right | 2.0 km || 
|-id=807 bgcolor=#d6d6d6
| 27807 ||  || — || March 19, 1993 || La Silla || UESAC || — || align=right | 9.2 km || 
|-id=808 bgcolor=#fefefe
| 27808 ||  || — || March 17, 1993 || La Silla || UESAC || FLO || align=right | 2.7 km || 
|-id=809 bgcolor=#fefefe
| 27809 ||  || — || April 20, 1993 || Kitami || K. Endate, K. Watanabe || — || align=right | 3.4 km || 
|-id=810 bgcolor=#fefefe
| 27810 Daveturner ||  ||  || July 23, 1993 || Palomar || C. S. Shoemaker, D. H. Levy || Hslow || align=right | 2.9 km || 
|-id=811 bgcolor=#fefefe
| 27811 ||  || — || July 20, 1993 || La Silla || E. W. Elst || NYS || align=right | 7.2 km || 
|-id=812 bgcolor=#fefefe
| 27812 ||  || — || July 20, 1993 || La Silla || E. W. Elst || NYS || align=right | 3.0 km || 
|-id=813 bgcolor=#E9E9E9
| 27813 ||  || — || August 14, 1993 || Caussols || E. W. Elst || — || align=right | 3.2 km || 
|-id=814 bgcolor=#E9E9E9
| 27814 || 1993 RR || — || September 16, 1993 || Kitt Peak || Spacewatch || — || align=right | 1.9 km || 
|-id=815 bgcolor=#E9E9E9
| 27815 ||  || — || September 16, 1993 || Kitami || K. Endate, K. Watanabe || — || align=right | 6.3 km || 
|-id=816 bgcolor=#E9E9E9
| 27816 ||  || — || October 15, 1993 || Kitami || K. Endate, K. Watanabe || — || align=right | 3.9 km || 
|-id=817 bgcolor=#E9E9E9
| 27817 ||  || — || October 9, 1993 || La Silla || E. W. Elst || — || align=right | 3.6 km || 
|-id=818 bgcolor=#d6d6d6
| 27818 ||  || — || October 9, 1993 || La Silla || E. W. Elst || KOR || align=right | 3.9 km || 
|-id=819 bgcolor=#E9E9E9
| 27819 ||  || — || October 9, 1993 || La Silla || E. W. Elst || — || align=right | 2.8 km || 
|-id=820 bgcolor=#E9E9E9
| 27820 ||  || — || October 9, 1993 || La Silla || E. W. Elst || — || align=right | 3.5 km || 
|-id=821 bgcolor=#d6d6d6
| 27821 ||  || — || October 9, 1993 || La Silla || E. W. Elst || 7:4 || align=right | 8.1 km || 
|-id=822 bgcolor=#E9E9E9
| 27822 ||  || — || October 19, 1993 || Palomar || E. F. Helin || — || align=right | 4.2 km || 
|-id=823 bgcolor=#E9E9E9
| 27823 ||  || — || October 20, 1993 || La Silla || E. W. Elst || — || align=right | 2.2 km || 
|-id=824 bgcolor=#E9E9E9
| 27824 ||  || — || October 20, 1993 || La Silla || E. W. Elst || — || align=right | 2.6 km || 
|-id=825 bgcolor=#E9E9E9
| 27825 || 1993 VP || — || November 9, 1993 || Kiyosato || S. Otomo || EUN || align=right | 4.8 km || 
|-id=826 bgcolor=#E9E9E9
| 27826 || 1993 WQ || — || November 22, 1993 || Nyukasa || M. Hirasawa, S. Suzuki || — || align=right | 6.0 km || 
|-id=827 bgcolor=#E9E9E9
| 27827 Ukai ||  ||  || December 9, 1993 || Nyukasa || M. Hirasawa, S. Suzuki || — || align=right | 9.2 km || 
|-id=828 bgcolor=#E9E9E9
| 27828 ||  || — || January 12, 1994 || Kushiro || S. Ueda, H. Kaneda || — || align=right | 8.2 km || 
|-id=829 bgcolor=#E9E9E9
| 27829 ||  || — || January 21, 1994 || Kiyosato || S. Otomo || DOR || align=right | 10 km || 
|-id=830 bgcolor=#d6d6d6
| 27830 ||  || — || February 8, 1994 || La Silla || E. W. Elst || EOS || align=right | 6.5 km || 
|-id=831 bgcolor=#E9E9E9
| 27831 || 1994 DF || — || February 18, 1994 || Oohira || T. Urata || EUN || align=right | 5.0 km || 
|-id=832 bgcolor=#fefefe
| 27832 || 1994 EW || — || March 10, 1994 || Kitt Peak || Spacewatch || — || align=right data-sort-value="0.99" | 990 m || 
|-id=833 bgcolor=#fefefe
| 27833 ||  || — || August 10, 1994 || La Silla || E. W. Elst || NYS || align=right | 2.9 km || 
|-id=834 bgcolor=#fefefe
| 27834 ||  || — || August 10, 1994 || La Silla || E. W. Elst || V || align=right | 3.0 km || 
|-id=835 bgcolor=#d6d6d6
| 27835 ||  || — || August 10, 1994 || La Silla || E. W. Elst || URS || align=right | 6.9 km || 
|-id=836 bgcolor=#fefefe
| 27836 ||  || — || August 10, 1994 || La Silla || E. W. Elst || FLO || align=right | 2.8 km || 
|-id=837 bgcolor=#fefefe
| 27837 ||  || — || August 10, 1994 || La Silla || E. W. Elst || — || align=right | 2.8 km || 
|-id=838 bgcolor=#fefefe
| 27838 ||  || — || August 12, 1994 || La Silla || E. W. Elst || FLO || align=right | 2.5 km || 
|-id=839 bgcolor=#fefefe
| 27839 ||  || — || August 12, 1994 || La Silla || E. W. Elst || — || align=right | 2.3 km || 
|-id=840 bgcolor=#fefefe
| 27840 ||  || — || August 12, 1994 || La Silla || E. W. Elst || NYS || align=right | 1.4 km || 
|-id=841 bgcolor=#fefefe
| 27841 ||  || — || August 10, 1994 || La Silla || E. W. Elst || — || align=right | 2.0 km || 
|-id=842 bgcolor=#fefefe
| 27842 || 1994 QJ || — || August 28, 1994 || Siding Spring || R. H. McNaught || PHO || align=right | 5.4 km || 
|-id=843 bgcolor=#fefefe
| 27843 ||  || — || September 5, 1994 || Kitt Peak || Spacewatch || — || align=right | 2.2 km || 
|-id=844 bgcolor=#fefefe
| 27844 ||  || — || October 2, 1994 || Kitami || K. Endate, K. Watanabe || FLO || align=right | 3.9 km || 
|-id=845 bgcolor=#fefefe
| 27845 Josephmeyer ||  ||  || October 5, 1994 || Tautenburg Observatory || F. Börngen || NYS || align=right | 4.4 km || 
|-id=846 bgcolor=#fefefe
| 27846 Honegger ||  ||  || October 5, 1994 || Tautenburg Observatory || F. Börngen || NYS || align=right | 1.6 km || 
|-id=847 bgcolor=#fefefe
| 27847 || 1994 UT || — || October 31, 1994 || Nachi-Katsuura || Y. Shimizu, T. Urata || — || align=right | 2.9 km || 
|-id=848 bgcolor=#fefefe
| 27848 || 1994 UZ || — || October 31, 1994 || Nachi-Katsuura || Y. Shimizu, T. Urata || NYS || align=right | 2.5 km || 
|-id=849 bgcolor=#fefefe
| 27849 Suyumbika ||  ||  || October 29, 1994 || Zelenchukskaya || T. V. Kryachko || FLO || align=right | 3.2 km || 
|-id=850 bgcolor=#fefefe
| 27850 ||  || — || October 31, 1994 || Kushiro || S. Ueda, H. Kaneda || ERI || align=right | 2.9 km || 
|-id=851 bgcolor=#fefefe
| 27851 ||  || — || November 8, 1994 || Kiyosato || S. Otomo || PHO || align=right | 9.6 km || 
|-id=852 bgcolor=#fefefe
| 27852 || 1994 WQ || — || November 25, 1994 || Oizumi || T. Kobayashi || — || align=right | 3.0 km || 
|-id=853 bgcolor=#fefefe
| 27853 ||  || — || December 6, 1994 || Oizumi || T. Kobayashi || NYS || align=right | 2.1 km || 
|-id=854 bgcolor=#E9E9E9
| 27854 ||  || — || December 28, 1994 || Oizumi || T. Kobayashi || — || align=right | 3.7 km || 
|-id=855 bgcolor=#E9E9E9
| 27855 Giorgilli || 1995 AK ||  || January 4, 1995 || Sormano || F. Manca, A. Testa || — || align=right | 2.4 km || 
|-id=856 bgcolor=#E9E9E9
| 27856 ||  || — || January 2, 1995 || Caussols || E. W. Elst || — || align=right | 3.1 km || 
|-id=857 bgcolor=#E9E9E9
| 27857 || 1995 BZ || — || January 25, 1995 || Oizumi || T. Kobayashi || — || align=right | 4.4 km || 
|-id=858 bgcolor=#fefefe
| 27858 ||  || — || January 30, 1995 || Sudbury || D. di Cicco || — || align=right | 5.0 km || 
|-id=859 bgcolor=#E9E9E9
| 27859 ||  || — || January 29, 1995 || Oizumi || T. Kobayashi || — || align=right | 4.4 km || 
|-id=860 bgcolor=#E9E9E9
| 27860 ||  || — || January 27, 1995 || Kushiro || S. Ueda, H. Kaneda || — || align=right | 5.2 km || 
|-id=861 bgcolor=#E9E9E9
| 27861 ||  || — || January 28, 1995 || Kitami || K. Endate, K. Watanabe || — || align=right | 5.7 km || 
|-id=862 bgcolor=#E9E9E9
| 27862 ||  || — || January 23, 1995 || Kitt Peak || Spacewatch || — || align=right | 2.5 km || 
|-id=863 bgcolor=#E9E9E9
| 27863 ||  || — || February 24, 1995 || Kitt Peak || Spacewatch || — || align=right | 3.3 km || 
|-id=864 bgcolor=#E9E9E9
| 27864 Antongraff ||  ||  || March 5, 1995 || Tautenburg Observatory || F. Börngen || — || align=right | 4.8 km || 
|-id=865 bgcolor=#E9E9E9
| 27865 Ludgerfroebel || 1995 FQ ||  || March 30, 1995 || La Silla || S. Mottola, E. Koldewey || — || align=right | 7.5 km || 
|-id=866 bgcolor=#E9E9E9
| 27866 ||  || — || March 23, 1995 || Kitt Peak || Spacewatch || — || align=right | 3.2 km || 
|-id=867 bgcolor=#E9E9E9
| 27867 ||  || — || May 26, 1995 || Kitt Peak || Spacewatch || slow || align=right | 7.1 km || 
|-id=868 bgcolor=#d6d6d6
| 27868 ||  || — || June 23, 1995 || Kitt Peak || Spacewatch || — || align=right | 6.3 km || 
|-id=869 bgcolor=#fefefe
| 27869 ||  || — || September 26, 1995 || Kitt Peak || Spacewatch || MAS || align=right | 2.0 km || 
|-id=870 bgcolor=#fefefe
| 27870 Jillwatson || 1995 VW ||  || November 12, 1995 || Haleakala || AMOS || — || align=right | 2.4 km || 
|-id=871 bgcolor=#fefefe
| 27871 ||  || — || November 15, 1995 || Kitt Peak || Spacewatch || — || align=right | 4.1 km || 
|-id=872 bgcolor=#fefefe
| 27872 ||  || — || November 28, 1995 || Oizumi || T. Kobayashi || — || align=right | 2.2 km || 
|-id=873 bgcolor=#fefefe
| 27873 ||  || — || December 15, 1995 || Oizumi || T. Kobayashi || NYS || align=right | 2.2 km || 
|-id=874 bgcolor=#fefefe
| 27874 ||  || — || December 21, 1995 || Oizumi || T. Kobayashi || — || align=right | 2.0 km || 
|-id=875 bgcolor=#fefefe
| 27875 ||  || — || January 27, 1996 || Oizumi || T. Kobayashi || — || align=right | 2.8 km || 
|-id=876 bgcolor=#fefefe
| 27876 ||  || — || January 24, 1996 || Socorro || Lincoln Lab ETS || V || align=right | 1.7 km || 
|-id=877 bgcolor=#fefefe
| 27877 ||  || — || January 16, 1996 || Kitt Peak || Spacewatch || — || align=right | 2.1 km || 
|-id=878 bgcolor=#fefefe
| 27878 ||  || — || February 11, 1996 || Oizumi || T. Kobayashi || FLO || align=right | 2.4 km || 
|-id=879 bgcolor=#fefefe
| 27879 Shibata ||  ||  || February 15, 1996 || Nanyo || T. Okuni || FLO || align=right | 3.3 km || 
|-id=880 bgcolor=#fefefe
| 27880 || 1996 EQ || — || March 14, 1996 || Sudbury || D. di Cicco || V || align=right | 2.2 km || 
|-id=881 bgcolor=#E9E9E9
| 27881 ||  || — || March 15, 1996 || Haleakala || NEAT || — || align=right | 3.2 km || 
|-id=882 bgcolor=#fefefe
| 27882 ||  || — || March 10, 1996 || Kitami || K. Endate, K. Watanabe || NYS || align=right | 3.2 km || 
|-id=883 bgcolor=#E9E9E9
| 27883 ||  || — || March 15, 1996 || Haleakala || NEAT || EUN || align=right | 5.1 km || 
|-id=884 bgcolor=#fefefe
| 27884 ||  || — || March 15, 1996 || Haleakala || NEAT || V || align=right | 2.8 km || 
|-id=885 bgcolor=#fefefe
| 27885 ||  || — || March 15, 1996 || Haleakala || NEAT || — || align=right | 5.3 km || 
|-id=886 bgcolor=#fefefe
| 27886 ||  || — || March 13, 1996 || Kitt Peak || Spacewatch || FLO || align=right | 2.9 km || 
|-id=887 bgcolor=#fefefe
| 27887 ||  || — || April 12, 1996 || Kitami || K. Endate, K. Watanabe || V || align=right | 3.3 km || 
|-id=888 bgcolor=#fefefe
| 27888 ||  || — || April 11, 1996 || Kitt Peak || Spacewatch || — || align=right | 2.8 km || 
|-id=889 bgcolor=#fefefe
| 27889 ||  || — || April 15, 1996 || La Silla || E. W. Elst || V || align=right | 2.7 km || 
|-id=890 bgcolor=#E9E9E9
| 27890 ||  || — || April 15, 1996 || La Silla || E. W. Elst || — || align=right | 8.1 km || 
|-id=891 bgcolor=#E9E9E9
| 27891 || 1996 HY || — || April 20, 1996 || Oizumi || T. Kobayashi || ADE || align=right | 8.9 km || 
|-id=892 bgcolor=#fefefe
| 27892 ||  || — || April 20, 1996 || La Silla || E. W. Elst || — || align=right | 3.1 km || 
|-id=893 bgcolor=#E9E9E9
| 27893 ||  || — || April 20, 1996 || La Silla || E. W. Elst || VIB || align=right | 3.8 km || 
|-id=894 bgcolor=#E9E9E9
| 27894 ||  || — || May 10, 1996 || Kitt Peak || Spacewatch || EUN || align=right | 3.5 km || 
|-id=895 bgcolor=#E9E9E9
| 27895 Yeduzheng || 1996 LL ||  || June 6, 1996 || Xinglong || SCAP || — || align=right | 3.9 km || 
|-id=896 bgcolor=#d6d6d6
| 27896 Tourminator || 1996 NB ||  || July 13, 1996 || Modra || A. Galád, A. Pravda || EOS || align=right | 4.5 km || 
|-id=897 bgcolor=#d6d6d6
| 27897 ||  || — || July 14, 1996 || La Silla || E. W. Elst || TEL || align=right | 5.5 km || 
|-id=898 bgcolor=#E9E9E9
| 27898 ||  || — || July 23, 1996 || Haleakala || AMOS || HEN || align=right | 3.1 km || 
|-id=899 bgcolor=#d6d6d6
| 27899 Letterman || 1996 QF ||  || August 18, 1996 || Sudbury || D. di Cicco || KOR || align=right | 4.2 km || 
|-id=900 bgcolor=#d6d6d6
| 27900 Cecconi || 1996 RM ||  || September 7, 1996 || Sormano || V. Giuliani, P. Chiavenna || — || align=right | 9.5 km || 
|}

27901–28000 

|-bgcolor=#d6d6d6
| 27901 ||  || — || September 13, 1996 || Haleakala || NEAT || — || align=right | 8.9 km || 
|-id=902 bgcolor=#d6d6d6
| 27902 ||  || — || September 13, 1996 || Church Stretton || S. P. Laurie || — || align=right | 8.0 km || 
|-id=903 bgcolor=#d6d6d6
| 27903 ||  || — || September 8, 1996 || Kitt Peak || Spacewatch || — || align=right | 5.2 km || 
|-id=904 bgcolor=#d6d6d6
| 27904 ||  || — || September 20, 1996 || Xinglong || SCAP || — || align=right | 5.8 km || 
|-id=905 bgcolor=#d6d6d6
| 27905 ||  || — || September 20, 1996 || Xinglong || SCAP || — || align=right | 8.9 km || 
|-id=906 bgcolor=#d6d6d6
| 27906 ||  || — || October 12, 1996 || Sudbury || D. di Cicco || — || align=right | 8.6 km || 
|-id=907 bgcolor=#d6d6d6
| 27907 ||  || — || October 15, 1996 || Kleť || Kleť Obs. || — || align=right | 6.6 km || 
|-id=908 bgcolor=#d6d6d6
| 27908 ||  || — || October 4, 1996 || Church Stretton || S. P. Laurie || 628 || align=right | 6.2 km || 
|-id=909 bgcolor=#d6d6d6
| 27909 ||  || — || October 14, 1996 || Lime Creek || R. Linderholm || — || align=right | 10 km || 
|-id=910 bgcolor=#E9E9E9
| 27910 ||  || — || October 10, 1996 || Xinglong || SCAP || — || align=right | 3.8 km || 
|-id=911 bgcolor=#d6d6d6
| 27911 ||  || — || October 10, 1996 || Xinglong || SCAP || EOS || align=right | 12 km || 
|-id=912 bgcolor=#d6d6d6
| 27912 ||  || — || October 9, 1996 || Kushiro || S. Ueda, H. Kaneda || EOS || align=right | 6.1 km || 
|-id=913 bgcolor=#d6d6d6
| 27913 ||  || — || October 8, 1996 || La Silla || E. W. Elst || EOS || align=right | 6.0 km || 
|-id=914 bgcolor=#d6d6d6
| 27914 ||  || — || October 8, 1996 || La Silla || E. W. Elst || KOR || align=right | 3.5 km || 
|-id=915 bgcolor=#d6d6d6
| 27915 Nancywright ||  ||  || October 30, 1996 || Prescott || P. G. Comba || HYG || align=right | 9.8 km || 
|-id=916 bgcolor=#d6d6d6
| 27916 ||  || — || November 1, 1996 || Xinglong || SCAP || — || align=right | 11 km || 
|-id=917 bgcolor=#d6d6d6
| 27917 Edoardo ||  ||  || November 6, 1996 || San Marcello || L. Tesi, G. Cattani || — || align=right | 8.6 km || 
|-id=918 bgcolor=#d6d6d6
| 27918 Azusagawa ||  ||  || November 6, 1996 || Chichibu || N. Satō || — || align=right | 11 km || 
|-id=919 bgcolor=#d6d6d6
| 27919 ||  || — || November 13, 1996 || Oizumi || T. Kobayashi || — || align=right | 6.6 km || 
|-id=920 bgcolor=#d6d6d6
| 27920 ||  || — || November 7, 1996 || Kitami || K. Endate, K. Watanabe || — || align=right | 16 km || 
|-id=921 bgcolor=#d6d6d6
| 27921 ||  || — || November 11, 1996 || Kitt Peak || Spacewatch || THM || align=right | 8.7 km || 
|-id=922 bgcolor=#d6d6d6
| 27922 Mascheroni ||  ||  || December 8, 1996 || Prescott || P. G. Comba || — || align=right | 10 km || 
|-id=923 bgcolor=#d6d6d6
| 27923 Dimitribartolini ||  ||  || December 4, 1996 || Cima Ekar || M. Tombelli, U. Munari || — || align=right | 8.7 km || 
|-id=924 bgcolor=#fefefe
| 27924 ||  || — || January 9, 1997 || Sudbury || D. di Cicco || — || align=right | 1.6 km || 
|-id=925 bgcolor=#fefefe
| 27925 ||  || — || February 1, 1997 || Oizumi || T. Kobayashi || NYSfast? || align=right | 2.0 km || 
|-id=926 bgcolor=#fefefe
| 27926 ||  || — || March 4, 1997 || Kitt Peak || Spacewatch || FLO || align=right | 1.7 km || 
|-id=927 bgcolor=#fefefe
| 27927 ||  || — || March 11, 1997 || Kitt Peak || Spacewatch || — || align=right | 2.1 km || 
|-id=928 bgcolor=#fefefe
| 27928 Nithintumma ||  ||  || March 5, 1997 || Socorro || LINEAR || V || align=right | 1.4 km || 
|-id=929 bgcolor=#fefefe
| 27929 ||  || — || March 28, 1997 || Xinglong || SCAP || — || align=right | 3.2 km || 
|-id=930 bgcolor=#E9E9E9
| 27930 Nakamatsu ||  ||  || April 2, 1997 || Socorro || LINEAR || — || align=right | 4.7 km || 
|-id=931 bgcolor=#fefefe
| 27931 Zeitlin-Trinkle ||  ||  || April 2, 1997 || Socorro || LINEAR || — || align=right | 2.2 km || 
|-id=932 bgcolor=#fefefe
| 27932 Leonyao ||  ||  || April 2, 1997 || Socorro || LINEAR || FLO || align=right | 1.6 km || 
|-id=933 bgcolor=#fefefe
| 27933 ||  || — || April 3, 1997 || Socorro || LINEAR || — || align=right | 2.2 km || 
|-id=934 bgcolor=#fefefe
| 27934 ||  || — || April 30, 1997 || Socorro || LINEAR || — || align=right | 2.3 km || 
|-id=935 bgcolor=#fefefe
| 27935 || 1997 JN || — || May 2, 1997 || Kitt Peak || Spacewatch || — || align=right | 2.0 km || 
|-id=936 bgcolor=#d6d6d6
| 27936 ||  || — || May 3, 1997 || La Silla || E. W. Elst || — || align=right | 5.9 km || 
|-id=937 bgcolor=#fefefe
| 27937 ||  || — || May 3, 1997 || La Silla || E. W. Elst || — || align=right | 2.8 km || 
|-id=938 bgcolor=#d6d6d6
| 27938 Guislain ||  ||  || May 3, 1997 || La Silla || E. W. Elst || AEG || align=right | 9.3 km || 
|-id=939 bgcolor=#fefefe
| 27939 ||  || — || June 5, 1997 || Kitt Peak || Spacewatch || V || align=right | 3.0 km || 
|-id=940 bgcolor=#E9E9E9
| 27940 ||  || — || June 9, 1997 || Kitt Peak || Spacewatch || — || align=right | 2.8 km || 
|-id=941 bgcolor=#E9E9E9
| 27941 ||  || — || June 13, 1997 || Kitt Peak || Spacewatch || GEF || align=right | 3.0 km || 
|-id=942 bgcolor=#fefefe
| 27942 ||  || — || June 7, 1997 || La Silla || E. W. Elst || — || align=right | 1.8 km || 
|-id=943 bgcolor=#fefefe
| 27943 ||  || — || June 7, 1997 || La Silla || E. W. Elst || — || align=right | 1.8 km || 
|-id=944 bgcolor=#fefefe
| 27944 ||  || — || June 28, 1997 || Socorro || LINEAR || FLO || align=right | 2.9 km || 
|-id=945 bgcolor=#fefefe
| 27945 ||  || — || June 28, 1997 || Socorro || LINEAR || NYS || align=right | 3.3 km || 
|-id=946 bgcolor=#fefefe
| 27946 || 1997 NA || — || July 1, 1997 || Kitt Peak || Spacewatch || — || align=right | 1.9 km || 
|-id=947 bgcolor=#fefefe
| 27947 Emilemathieu ||  ||  || July 9, 1997 || Prescott || P. G. Comba || — || align=right | 5.3 km || 
|-id=948 bgcolor=#fefefe
| 27948 ||  || — || July 6, 1997 || Kitt Peak || Spacewatch || NYS || align=right | 2.4 km || 
|-id=949 bgcolor=#fefefe
| 27949 Jonasz ||  ||  || July 8, 1997 || Caussols || ODAS || — || align=right | 3.5 km || 
|-id=950 bgcolor=#fefefe
| 27950 ||  || — || July 30, 1997 || Rand || G. R. Viscome || NYS || align=right | 1.9 km || 
|-id=951 bgcolor=#fefefe
| 27951 ||  || — || July 30, 1997 || Caussols || ODAS || NYS || align=right | 2.0 km || 
|-id=952 bgcolor=#fefefe
| 27952 Atapuerca ||  ||  || August 11, 1997 || Majorca || Á. López J., R. Pacheco || V || align=right | 2.8 km || 
|-id=953 bgcolor=#fefefe
| 27953 ||  || — || August 11, 1997 || Xinglong || SCAP || NYS || align=right | 2.4 km || 
|-id=954 bgcolor=#E9E9E9
| 27954 ||  || — || August 27, 1997 || Nachi-Katsuura || Y. Shimizu, T. Urata || MAR || align=right | 3.3 km || 
|-id=955 bgcolor=#fefefe
| 27955 Yasumasa ||  ||  || August 24, 1997 || Nanyo || T. Okuni || — || align=right | 4.5 km || 
|-id=956 bgcolor=#d6d6d6
| 27956 || 1997 RC || — || September 1, 1997 || Kleť || Z. Moravec || KOR || align=right | 4.1 km || 
|-id=957 bgcolor=#fefefe
| 27957 ||  || — || September 12, 1997 || Xinglong || SCAP || — || align=right | 2.9 km || 
|-id=958 bgcolor=#fefefe
| 27958 Giussano ||  ||  || September 9, 1997 || Sormano || V. Giuliani || NYS || align=right | 2.7 km || 
|-id=959 bgcolor=#fefefe
| 27959 Fagioli ||  ||  || September 19, 1997 || San Marcello || L. Tesi || V || align=right | 2.3 km || 
|-id=960 bgcolor=#E9E9E9
| 27960 Dobiáš ||  ||  || September 21, 1997 || Ondřejov || L. Kotková || EUN || align=right | 3.7 km || 
|-id=961 bgcolor=#E9E9E9
| 27961 Kostelecký ||  ||  || September 22, 1997 || Kleť || M. Tichý || — || align=right | 2.4 km || 
|-id=962 bgcolor=#E9E9E9
| 27962 ||  || — || September 23, 1997 || Ondřejov || M. Wolf, P. Pravec || — || align=right | 4.0 km || 
|-id=963 bgcolor=#d6d6d6
| 27963 Hartkopf ||  ||  || September 25, 1997 || Ondřejov || P. Pravec, M. Wolf || K-2 || align=right | 2.9 km || 
|-id=964 bgcolor=#E9E9E9
| 27964 ||  || — || September 27, 1997 || Caussols || ODAS || — || align=right | 5.0 km || 
|-id=965 bgcolor=#fefefe
| 27965 ||  || — || September 29, 1997 || Nachi-Katsuura || Y. Shimizu, T. Urata || MAS || align=right | 2.6 km || 
|-id=966 bgcolor=#d6d6d6
| 27966 Changguang ||  ||  || September 16, 1997 || Xinglong || SCAP || — || align=right | 9.0 km || 
|-id=967 bgcolor=#E9E9E9
| 27967 Beppebianchi || 1997 TE ||  || October 1, 1997 || Bologna || San Vittore Obs. || — || align=right | 6.1 km || 
|-id=968 bgcolor=#fefefe
| 27968 Bobylapointe ||  ||  || October 3, 1997 || Caussols || ODAS || MAS || align=right | 2.3 km || 
|-id=969 bgcolor=#E9E9E9
| 27969 ||  || — || October 3, 1997 || Caussols || ODAS || — || align=right | 8.0 km || 
|-id=970 bgcolor=#E9E9E9
| 27970 ||  || — || October 2, 1997 || Kitt Peak || Spacewatch || — || align=right | 2.7 km || 
|-id=971 bgcolor=#E9E9E9
| 27971 ||  || — || October 2, 1997 || Kitt Peak || Spacewatch || — || align=right | 2.3 km || 
|-id=972 bgcolor=#E9E9E9
| 27972 ||  || — || October 8, 1997 || Dynic || A. Sugie || ADE || align=right | 5.8 km || 
|-id=973 bgcolor=#E9E9E9
| 27973 ||  || — || October 12, 1997 || Xinglong || SCAP || — || align=right | 6.5 km || 
|-id=974 bgcolor=#E9E9E9
| 27974 Drejsl || 1997 UH ||  || October 19, 1997 || Ondřejov || L. Kotková || — || align=right | 6.8 km || 
|-id=975 bgcolor=#E9E9E9
| 27975 Mazurkiewicz ||  ||  || October 23, 1997 || Prescott || P. G. Comba || — || align=right | 4.4 km || 
|-id=976 bgcolor=#E9E9E9
| 27976 ||  || — || October 26, 1997 || Oizumi || T. Kobayashi || — || align=right | 4.6 km || 
|-id=977 bgcolor=#E9E9E9
| 27977 Distratis ||  ||  || October 25, 1997 || San Marcello || L. Tesi, A. Boattini || — || align=right | 4.0 km || 
|-id=978 bgcolor=#E9E9E9
| 27978 Lubosluka ||  ||  || October 29, 1997 || Ondřejov || L. Kotková || — || align=right | 4.8 km || 
|-id=979 bgcolor=#d6d6d6
| 27979 ||  || — || October 28, 1997 || Kitt Peak || Spacewatch || — || align=right | 4.9 km || 
|-id=980 bgcolor=#E9E9E9
| 27980 ||  || — || October 27, 1997 || Xinglong || SCAP || — || align=right | 3.0 km || 
|-id=981 bgcolor=#E9E9E9
| 27981 ||  || — || October 20, 1997 || Xinglong || SCAP || — || align=right | 4.2 km || 
|-id=982 bgcolor=#d6d6d6
| 27982 Atsushimiyazaki ||  ||  || October 26, 1997 || Chichibu || N. Satō || 628 || align=right | 5.0 km || 
|-id=983 bgcolor=#E9E9E9
| 27983 Bernardi ||  ||  || October 26, 1997 || Cima Ekar || A. Boattini, M. Tombelli || — || align=right | 4.1 km || 
|-id=984 bgcolor=#E9E9E9
| 27984 Herminefranz || 1997 VN ||  || November 1, 1997 || Starkenburg Observatory || Starkenburg Obs. || AEO || align=right | 3.1 km || 
|-id=985 bgcolor=#d6d6d6
| 27985 Remanzacco ||  ||  || November 2, 1997 || Remanzacco || Remanzacco Obs. || KOR || align=right | 5.5 km || 
|-id=986 bgcolor=#E9E9E9
| 27986 Hanuš ||  ||  || November 4, 1997 || Ondřejov || L. Kotková || — || align=right | 3.0 km || 
|-id=987 bgcolor=#E9E9E9
| 27987 ||  || — || November 6, 1997 || Oizumi || T. Kobayashi || — || align=right | 5.8 km || 
|-id=988 bgcolor=#d6d6d6
| 27988 Menabrea ||  ||  || November 7, 1997 || Prescott || P. G. Comba || — || align=right | 6.8 km || 
|-id=989 bgcolor=#d6d6d6
| 27989 ||  || — || November 7, 1997 || Oizumi || T. Kobayashi || — || align=right | 11 km || 
|-id=990 bgcolor=#d6d6d6
| 27990 ||  || — || November 9, 1997 || Oizumi || T. Kobayashi || EOS || align=right | 9.4 km || 
|-id=991 bgcolor=#d6d6d6
| 27991 Koheijimiura ||  ||  || November 6, 1997 || Chichibu || N. Satō || KOR || align=right | 4.5 km || 
|-id=992 bgcolor=#d6d6d6
| 27992 ||  || — || November 2, 1997 || Xinglong || SCAP || EOS || align=right | 9.8 km || 
|-id=993 bgcolor=#E9E9E9
| 27993 || 1997 WK || — || November 18, 1997 || Oizumi || T. Kobayashi || — || align=right | 6.9 km || 
|-id=994 bgcolor=#d6d6d6
| 27994 ||  || — || November 19, 1997 || Xinglong || SCAP || EOS || align=right | 9.8 km || 
|-id=995 bgcolor=#FA8072
| 27995 ||  || — || November 23, 1997 || Oizumi || T. Kobayashi || — || align=right | 2.1 km || 
|-id=996 bgcolor=#d6d6d6
| 27996 ||  || — || November 23, 1997 || Kitt Peak || Spacewatch || — || align=right | 7.4 km || 
|-id=997 bgcolor=#fefefe
| 27997 Bandos ||  ||  || November 23, 1997 || Chichibu || N. Satō || — || align=right | 2.4 km || 
|-id=998 bgcolor=#E9E9E9
| 27998 ||  || — || November 20, 1997 || Kitt Peak || Spacewatch || — || align=right | 3.7 km || 
|-id=999 bgcolor=#d6d6d6
| 27999 ||  || — || November 30, 1997 || Oizumi || T. Kobayashi || KOR || align=right | 6.2 km || 
|-id=000 bgcolor=#d6d6d6
| 28000 ||  || — || November 29, 1997 || Socorro || LINEAR || KOR || align=right | 6.3 km || 
|}

References

External links 
 Discovery Circumstances: Numbered Minor Planets (25001)–(30000) (IAU Minor Planet Center)

0027